= List of philosophers of language =

This is a list of philosophers of language.

- Virgil Aldrich
- William Alston
- G. E. M. Anscombe
- Karl-Otto Apel
- Saint Thomas Aquinas, OP
- Aristotle
- J. L. Austin
- Alfred Jules Ayer
- Joxe Azurmendi
- Jody Azzouni
- Kent Bach
- Ingeborg Bachmann
- Archie J. Bahm
- Yehoshua Bar-Hillel
- Walter Benjamin
- Jonathan Bennett
- Henri Bergson
- Max Black
- Paul Boghossian
- Andrea Bonomi
- Jacques Bouveresse
- F. H. Bradley
- Robert Brandom
- Berit Brogaard
- Cardinal Thomas Cajetan, OP
- Herman Cappelen
- Rudolf Carnap
- Hector-Neri Castañeda
- Stanley Cavell
- Melchiorre Cesarotti
- David Chalmers
- Cheung Kam Ching
- Noam Chomsky
- Alonzo Church
- Nino Cocchiarella
- James F. Conant
- William Crathorn
- Donald Davidson
- Arda Denkel
- Michael Devitt
- Keith Donnellan
- William C. Dowling
- César Chesneau Dumarsais
- Michael Dummett
- David Efird
- S. Morris Engel
- John Etchemendy
- Gareth Evans
- Kit Fine
- Dagfinn Føllesdal
- Gottlob Frege
- Marilyn Frye
- Robert Maximilian de Gaynesford
- Peter Geach
- Alexander George
- Allan Gibbard
- Gongsun Long
- Nelson Goodman
- Paul Grice
- Jeroen Groenendijk
- Samuel Guttenplan
- Þorsteinn Gylfason
- Susan Haack
- Jürgen Habermas
- Peter Hacker
- Ian Hacking
- Axel Hägerström
- Bob Hale
- Oswald Hanfling
- Gilbert Harman
- John Hawthorne
- Jaakko Hintikka
- William Hirstein
- Richard Hönigswald
- Jennifer Hornsby
- Paul Horwich
- Wilhelm von Humboldt
- Carrie Ichikawa Jenkins
- David Kaplan
- Jerrold Katz
- Saul Kripke
- Mark Lance
- Stephen Laurence
- Ernest Lepore
- David Kellogg Lewis
- John Locke
- Béatrice Longuenesse
- Paul Lorenzen
- William Lycan
- John McDowell
- Colin McGinn
- Merab Mamardashvili
- Ruth Barcan Marcus
- José Medina
- Maurice Merleau-Ponty
- John Stuart Mill
- Ruth Millikan
- Richard Montague
- Charles W. Morris
- Adam Morton
- Stephen Neale
- William of Ockham
- Jesús Padilla Gálvez
- Peter Pagin
- L.A. Paul
- Charles Sanders Peirce
- Carlo Penco
- John Perry
- Gualtiero Piccinini
- Steven Pinker
- Plato
- Hilary Putnam
- Willard Van Orman Quine
- Adolf Reinach
- Denise Riley
- Richard Rorty
- Roscellinus
- Jay Rosenberg
- Bertrand Russell's views on philosophy
- Bertrand Russell
- Gilbert Ryle
- Robert Rynasiewicz
- Mark Sainsbury
- Nathan Salmon
- Stephen Schiffer
- Duns Scotus
- John Searle
- Susanna Siegel
- Brian Skyrms
- Quentin Smith
- Scott Soames
- David Sosa
- Robert Stalnaker
- Jason Stanley
- John of St. Thomas, OP (John Poinsot)
- Jaun Elia
- Stephen Yablo
- P. F. Strawson
- Alfred Tarski
- Charles Taylor
- Ken Taylor
- Ernst Tugendhat
- Michael Tye
- Zeno Vendler
- Vācaspati Miśra
- Friedrich Waismann
- Brian Weatherson
- Michael Williams
- Timothy Williamson
- John Wisdom
- Ludwig Wittgenstein
- Crispin Wright
- Georg Henrik von Wright
- Edward N. Zalta
- Eddy Zemach
- Paul Ziff
- Dean Zimmerman
