= Proper name (philosophy) =

Name which is taken to uniquely identify its referent in the world

In the philosophy of language, a proper name – examples include a name of a specific person or place – is a name which ordinarily is taken to uniquely identify its referent in the world. As such it presents particular challenges for theories of meaning, and it has become a central problem in analytic philosophy. The common-sense view was originally formulated by John Stuart Mill in A System of Logic (1843), where he defines it as "a word that answers the purpose of showing what thing it is that we are talking about but not of telling anything about it". This view was criticized when philosophers applied principles of formal logic to linguistic propositions. Gottlob Frege pointed out that proper names may apply to imaginary or nonexistent entities, without becoming meaningless, and he showed that sometimes more than one proper name may identify the same entity without having the same sense, so that the phrase "Homer believed the morning star was the evening star" could be meaningful and not tautological in spite of the fact that the morning star and the evening star identify the same referent. This example became known as Frege's puzzle, and is a central issue in the theory of proper names.

Bertrand Russell was the first to propose a descriptivist theory of names, which held that a proper name refers not to a referent, but to a set of true propositions that uniquely describe a referent – for example, "Aristotle" refers to "the teacher of Alexander the Great". Rejecting descriptivism, Saul Kripke and Keith Donnellan instead advanced causal-historical theories of reference, which hold that names come to be associated with individual referents because social groups who link the name to its reference in a naming event (e.g. a baptism), which henceforth fixes the value of the name to the specific referent within that community. Today a direct reference theory is common, which holds that proper names refer to their referents without attributing any additional information, connotative or of sense, about them.

== Problems ==
The problems of proper names arise within a theory of meaning that is based on truth values and propositional logic, when trying to ascertain the criteria with which to determine if propositions that include proper names are true or false.

For example, in the proposition Cicero is Roman, it is unclear what semantic content the proper name Cicero provides to the proposition. One may intuitively assume that the name refers to a person who may or may not be Roman, and that the truth value depends on whether or not that is the case. But from the point of view of a theory of meaning the question is how the word Cicero establishes its referent.

Another problem, known as "Frege's puzzle", asks why it can be the case that the two names can refer to the same referent, yet not necessarily be considered entirely synonymous. His example is that the proposition "Hesperus is Hesperus" (Hesperus being the Greek name of the evening star) is tautological and vacuous while the proposition "Hesperus is Phosphorus" (Phosphorus or Eosphorus being the Greek name of the morning star) conveys information. This puzzle suggests that there is something more to the meaning of the proper name than simply pointing out its referent.

== Theories ==
Many theories have been proposed about proper names, each attempting to solve the problems of reference and identity inherent in the concept.

=== Millian theory ===
John Stuart Mill distinguished between connotative and denotative meaning, and argued that proper names included no other semantic content to a proposition than identifying the referent of the name and were hence purely denotative. Some contemporary proponents of a Millian theory of proper names argue that the process through which something becomes a proper name is exactly the gradual loss of connotation for pure denotation – such as the process that turned the descriptive propositions "long island" into the proper name Long Island.

=== Sense-based theory of names ===
Gotlob Frege argued that one had to distinguish between the sense (Sinn) and the reference of the name, and that different names for the same entity might identify the same referent without being formally synonymous. For example, although the morning star and the evening star are the same astronomical object, the proposition "the morning star is the evening star" is not a tautology, but provides actual information to someone who did not know this. Hence, to Frege, the two names for the object must have a different sense. Philosophers such as John McDowell have elaborated on Frege's theory of proper names.

=== Descriptive theory ===
"The only kind of word that is theoretically capable of standing for a particular is a proper name, and the whole matter of proper names is rather curious."

— Bertrand Russell, Logic and Knowledge, 1988

The descriptive theory of proper names is the view that the meaning of a given use of a proper name is a set of properties that can be expressed as a description that picks out an object that satisfies the description. Bertrand Russell espoused such a view arguing that the name refers to a description, and that description, like a definition, picks out the bearer of the name. The name then functions as an abbreviation or a truncated form of the description. The distinction between the embedded description and the bearer itself is similar to that between the extension and the intension (Frege's terms) of a general term, or between connotation and denotation (Mill's terms).

John Searle elaborated Russell's theory, suggesting that the proper name refers to a cluster of propositions that in combination pick out a unique referent. This was meant to deal with the objection by some critics of Russell's theory that a descriptive theory of meaning would make the referent of a name dependent on the knowledge that the person saying the name has about the referent.

In 1973, Tyler Burge proposed a metalinguistic descriptivist theory of proper names which holds that names have the meaning that corresponds to the description of the individual entities to whom the name is applied. This, however, opens up the possibility that names are not proper, when, for example, more than one person shares the same name. This leads Burge to argue that plural usages of names, such as "all the Alfreds I know have red hair", support this view.

=== Causal theory of names ===
The causal-historical theory originated by Saul Kripke in Naming and Necessity, building on work by, among others, Keith Donnellan, combines the referential view with the idea that a name's referent is fixed by a baptismal act, whereupon the name becomes a rigid designator of the referent. Kripke did not emphasize causality, but rather the historical relation between the naming event and the community of speakers within which it circulates, but in spite of this the theory is often called "a causal theory of naming".

The pragmatic naming theory of Charles Sanders Peirce is sometimes considered a precursor of causal-historical naming theory. He described proper names in the following terms: "A proper name, when one meets with it for the first time, is existentially connected with some percept or other equivalent individual knowledge of the individual it names. It is then, and then only, a genuine Index. The next time one meets with it, one regards it as an Icon of that Index. The habitual acquaintance with it having been acquired, it becomes a Symbol whose Interpretant represents it as an Icon of an Index of the Individual named." Here he notes out that the baptismal event takes place for each person when a proper name is first associated with a referent (for example by pointing and saying "this is John", establishing an indexical relation between the name and the person) who is henceforth considered to be a conventional ("symbolic" in Peircean terms) references to the referent. [ "who is...a conventional....references to the referent" is grammatically incorrect, rendering the whole sentence incoherent]

=== Direct reference theories ===
Rejecting sense-based, descriptivist and causal-historical theories of naming, theories of direct reference hold that names together with demonstratives are a class of words that refer directly to their referent.

In the Tractatus Logico Philosophicus, Ludwig Wittgenstein also held a direct reference position, arguing that names refer to a particular directly, and that this referent is its only meaning. In his later work, however, he has been attributed a cluster-descriptivist position based on the idea of family resemblances (for example by Kripke), although it has been argued that this misconstrues Wittgenstein's argument. Particularly, his later view has been compared to that of Kripke's own view which recognizes names as stemming from a social convention and pragmatic principles of understanding others utterances.

Direct reference theory is similar to Mill's theory in that it proposes that the only meaning of a proper name is its referent. Modern proposals such as those by David Kaplan, which distinguish between Fregean and non-Fregean terms, the former which have both sense and reference and the latter which include proper names and have only reference.

=== Continental philosophy ===
Outside of the analytic tradition, few continental philosophers have approached the proper name as a philosophical problem. In Of Grammatology, Jacques Derrida specifically refutes the idea that proper names stand outside of the social construct of language as a binary relation between referent and sign. Rather, he argues the proper name as all words are caught up in a context of social, spatial, and temporal differences that make it meaningful. He also notes that there are subjective elements of meaning in proper names, since they connect the bearer of a name with the sign of their own identity.

== See also ==
- Opaque context
- Singular term
