= Frege's puzzles =

Puzzles about the semantics of proper names

Frege's puzzles are puzzles about the semantics of proper names, although related puzzles also arise in the case of indexicals. Gottlob Frege (1848–1925) introduced the puzzle at the beginning of his article "Über Sinn und Bedeutung" ("On Sense and Reference") in 1892 in one of the most influential articles in analytic philosophy and philosophy of language.

== The puzzles ==
The term "Frege's puzzle" is commonly applied to two related problems. One is a problem about identity statements that Frege raised at the beginning of "On Sense and Reference", and another concerns propositional attitude reports.

=== The first puzzle ===
The first problem considers the following sentences:

1. Hesperus is Hesperus.
2. Hesperus is Phosphorus (Lucifer).

Each of these sentences is true, since 'Hesperus' refers to the same object as 'Phosphorus' (the planet Venus which few months apart can be seen as the brightest star of morning or of evening). Nonetheless, (1) and (2) seem to differ in their meaning or what Frege called "cognitive value". (1) is just a truth of logic that can be known a priori, whereas (2) records an empirical truth that was discovered by astronomers. The problem, however, is that proper names are often taken to have no meaning beyond their reference (a view often associated with John Stuart Mill). But this seems to imply that the two statements mean the same thing, or have the same cognitive value.

Frege proposed to resolve this puzzle by postulating a second level of meaning besides reference in the form of what he called sense: a difference in the mode of presentation or the way an object can be "given" to the observer. Thus 'Hesperus' and 'Phosphorus' have the same reference, but differ in sense because they present Venus in different ways.

=== The second puzzle ===
The second puzzle concerns propositional attitude reports, such as belief reports. Ordinarily, coreferring names are substitutable salva veritate, that is, without change in truth value. For example, if 'Hesperus is bright' is true then 'Phosphorus is bright' is also true given that 'Hesperus' and 'Phosphorus' refer to the same planet. Frege then considers the following argument:

3. Alex believes Hesperus is visible in the evening.
4. Hesperus = Phosphorus.
5. Alex believes Phosphorus is visible in the evening.

This argument appears to be invalid: even if (3) and (4) are true, (5) could be false. If Alex is not aware that Hesperus and Phosphorus are the same planet, then it seems that he could believe that Hesperus is visible in the evening while rejecting the claim that Phosphorus is visible in the evening (perhaps he thinks Phosphorus, the morning star, is only visible in the morning). The principle that coreferring names are substitutable salva veritate thus appears to fail in the context of belief reports (and similarly for other propositional attitude reports).

Frege again proposed to solve this problem by appeal to his distinction between sense and reference. In particular, he held that when a proper name occurs in the context of an attitude report, its reference shifts to its ordinary sense: thus 'Phosphorus', for example, denotes the planet Venus when it occurs in the sentence 'Phosphorus is visible in the evening' or in an identity sentence like (4), but when it occurs embedded in an attitude report like (5) it denotes its ordinary sense.

== New theories of reference and the return of Frege's puzzle ==
Frege's puzzle has received a great deal of attention since the attacks on the descriptivist theory of names mounted in the 1970s and 1980s by philosophers such as Keith Donnellan, Saul Kripke, Ruth Barcan Marcus, Hilary Putnam, and David Kaplan. In the wake of these attacks on descriptivism, many philosophers embraced the Millian or direct-reference view of proper names, according to which the meaning of a name is simply its referent. As noted above, this Millian view has the result that (1) and (2) express the same proposition. Similarly, the embedded sentences 'Hesperus is visible in the evening' and 'Phosphorus is visible in the evening' from (3) and (5) express the same proposition. It therefore looks like (3) and (5) cannot differ in truth value since they attribute belief in one and the same proposition.

In view of this problem, many philosophers of language have attempted to work out a solution to the puzzle within the confines of direct-reference theories of proper names. Some of these philosophers include Nathan Salmon (e.g. in Frege's puzzle and Content, Cognition, and Communication), Howard Wettstein (e.g. in "Has Semantics Rested on a Mistake?"), Scott Soames, David Kaplan, John Perry (e.g. in Reference and Reflexivity), and Joseph Almog.
