= Descriptivism =

Descriptivism may refer to:

- Descriptivist theory of names in philosophy, a view of the nature of meaning and reference generally attributed to Gottlob Frege and Bertrand Russell
- Linguistic descriptivism, the practice of objectively analysing and describing how language is spoken
