= Proposition =

Bearer of truth values

Propositions are the meanings of declarative sentences, objects of beliefs, and bearers of truth values. A proposition is what sentences with the same meaning have in common, such as the English "Snow is white" and the German "Schnee ist weiß". Similarly, propositions explain that different people can share a belief by being directed at the same content. True propositions describe the world as it is, while false ones fail to do so. Researchers distinguish types of propositions by their informational content and mode of assertion, such as the contrasts between affirmative and negative propositions, between universal and existential propositions, and between categorical and conditional propositions.

Many theories of the nature and roles of propositions have been proposed. Realists argue that propositions form part of reality, a view rejected by anti-realists. Non-reductive realists understand propositions as a unique kind of entity, whereas reductive realists analyze them in terms of other entities. One proposal sees them as sets of possible worlds, reflecting the idea that understanding a proposition involves grasping the circumstances under which it would be true. A different suggestion focuses on the individuals and concepts to which a proposition refers, defining propositions as structured entities composed of these constituents. Other accounts characterize propositions as specific kinds of properties, relations, or states of affairs. Philosophers also debate whether propositions are abstract objects outside space and time, psychological entities dependent on mental activity, or linguistic entities grounded in language. Paradoxes challenge the different theories of propositions, such as the liar paradox. The study of propositions has its roots in ancient philosophy, with influential contributions from Aristotle and the Stoics, and later from William of Ockham, Gottlob Frege, and Bertrand Russell.

Propositions are relevant to many fields. Logicians examine their logical form and inferential patterns as the premises and conclusions of arguments. Linguists investigate propositions as the meanings of declarative sentences and explore how natural language encodes this information, including the issues of ambiguity, vagueness, and context sensitivity. In psychology and philosophy of mind, researchers analyze how the mind deals with propositions, studying propositional attitudes such as belief, desire, and intention.

== Definition and roles ==
Propositions are the meanings of declarative sentences, and different sentences can express the same proposition, indicated by $P$ in the diagram.

Propositions are typically characterized in terms of three interlocking roles: as the meanings of declarative sentences, as the contents of psychological attitudes like beliefs, and as the bearers of truth values. Philosophers debate the relations between these characterizations, questioning whether one is more fundamental than the others and whether they all describe the same class of entities.

In their role as the meanings of declarative sentences, propositions are the ideas or semantic contents expressed by assertions such as "The door is open". Declarative sentences express what is the case. They contrast with interrogative sentences, like "Is the door open?", which request information, and imperative sentences, such as "Open the door!", which issue commands. Different declarative sentences can express the same idea, like the English sentence "Snow is white" and the German sentence "Schnee ist weiß". Accordingly, propositions are not identical to individual sentences and do not belong to any particular language. (Note: The difference is sometimes marked by using angle brackets for propositions instead of quotation marks for sentences, as in $\langle$Snow is white$\rangle$.) Instead, they reflect the information content of sentences and track cross-linguistic sameness. The terms "proposition" and "statement" are sometimes used as synonyms. (Note: Logical positivists use the verification principle to distinguish statements from propositions. According to this view, all declarative sentences express statements but only verifiable statements are propositions.) However, the word "statement" is ambiguous since it can also refer to declarative sentences themselves rather than their meanings. The term proposition also overlaps with the term judgment, with one difference being that judgments are more closely associated with mental processes that affirm or deny the truth of a content.

Propositions are further characterized as the contents or objects of psychological attitudes like beliefs. For example, if Leila believes that the train will be delayed, then she has a mental state, called a propositional attitude, directed at the proposition that the train will be delayed. There are many propositional attitudes besides beliefs, such as desires, hopes, and fears, like when Leila fears that the train will be delayed. The contents of propositional attitudes are shareable: different persons can have the same beliefs or fears, like when Diego also fears that the train will be delayed. Accordingly, propositions are not identical to individual beliefs or desires since the same proposition can underlie many individual mental states. Traditionally, propositions have been understood as non-mental or abstract entities, though alternative proposals see them as general types of mental entities. Propositional attitudes are typically expressed through that-clauses to link a psychological attitude to a proposition, as in "she believes that it will rain". For this reason, propositions are also characterized as the referents of that-clauses.

Propositions are additionally treated as bearers of truth values. This means that each proposition is either true or false. The truth value of a proposition depends on its accuracy: true propositions describe the world as it is while false propositions fail to do so. Propositions are not the only entities that have truth values. Other truth-bearers include declarative sentences and beliefs, raising the question of how these truth-bearers relate to each other. According to one proposal, propositions are the primary truth-bearers, meaning that declarative sentences and beliefs are true or false in a derivative sense by being about true or false propositions. Propositions are also discussed as bearers of modal properties: a proposition can be possible, impossible, or necessary, depending on whether it is logically compatible with coherent scenarios, or in some sense conceivable or contradictory.

The word proposition originates from the Latin term proponere, meaning 'to set forth or propose'. Through its past participle propositus, it gave rise to the Latin terms propositio and proposition and the Old French term proposition. The word entered the English language as a borrowing from Latin and French during the Middle English period, with its first known use in Wycliffe's Bible in 1382.

== Types ==
Various types of propositions are distinguished based on the kind and domain of information they convey and how they assert it. Many of the distinctions overlap and can be combined to form more specific subtypes. For example, a universal proposition can be either affirmative or negative. Affirmative propositions state that something is the case, such as "the tree is green". They contrast with negative propositions, which deny that something is the case, like "the tree is not green". In classical logic, a proposition with a double negation, such as "the tree is not not green", is equivalent to an affirmative proposition. In some cases, roughly the same information can be expressed with and without negations, as in "he is not happy" and "he is sad". This raises the question of whether being affirmative or negative is an essential feature of propositions at the level of content rather than a linguistic artifact at the level of expression. A closely related distinction is between true and false propositions: a true proposition accurately represents reality, while a false proposition misrepresents it. If an affirmative proposition is true, then the corresponding negative proposition is false, and vice versa.

Universal propositions assert that something is the case for all entities in a domain, as in "all humans are mortal". They contrast with existential propositions, which state that something is the case for at least one entity in a domain, such as "some humans are left-handed". Both universal and existential propositions make general statements. Unlike them, singular propositions are about one specific entity, as in "Socrates is wise". Philosophers discuss various problems associated with the nature and existence of singular propositions, like how to understand propositions about non-existing entities, as in "Santa Claus has a beard".

Another distinction is between categorical and conditional propositions. Categorical propositions assert how things are, independently of other statements or assumptions. Conditional or hypothetical propositions link two simpler propositions, typically expressed as an "if-then" sentence. They hold that the then-statement, called the consequent, is true in case the if-statement, called the antecedent, is true, as in "if it rains, then the ground gets wet". Conditional propositions are compound propositions since they have components that are themselves propositions. Other compound propositions include conjunctive and disjunctive propositions. Conjunctive propositions claim that all their component statements are true, typically expressed as an "and" sentence, such as "the tree is green and the sky is blue". Disjunctive propositions assert that one of their component statements is true, typically expressed as an "or" sentence, as in "it is windy or it is rainy". For inclusive disjunctive propositions, at least one but possibly both component statements are true, while for exclusive disjunctive propositions, exactly one component statement is true and the other is false.

The difference between analytic and synthetic propositions depends on the source of their truth. The truth of analytic propositions is determined only by the meanings of concepts, independent of the actual state of the world. For example, the proposition "all bachelors are unmarried" is analytically true because the concept "bachelor" already includes the meaning of "unmarried". The truth of synthetic propositions, such as "snow is white", depends on the state of the world. (Note: The distinction between analytic and synthetic proposition has been criticized in 20th century philosophy, with Willard Van Orman Quine arguing that there are no analytic truths.) A similar distinction, based on the source of knowledge rather than truth, is between a priori and a posteriori propositions. A priori propositions can be known through pure reasoning alone, such as "$2 + 2 = 4$", while a posteriori propositions describe empirical facts knowable through sensory experience, like "the sun is shining".

Modal propositions express what is possible, necessary, or impossible. Rather than asserting how the world is, they describe how it could or could not have been, as in "it is possible that I will win the lottery" and "it is impossible to travel faster than light". Logicians examine the relation between different modal propositions. For example, classical modal logic states that a proposition is necessarily true if it is impossible that it is false. There are different types of modality. Alethic modality is about what is possible or necessary relative to the laws of nature, metaphysics, or logic. It contrasts with epistemic modality, which concerns what may or must be the case relative to someone's knowledge or evidence, as in "the butler cannot be the killer". Similarly, deterministic propositions express certain information, while probabilistic propositions indicate degrees of uncertainty.

Normative propositions express what ought to be the case, like "you should not drink and drive". They include permissions, requirements, and prohibitions. Moral propositions are normative propositions that assert moral principles or judgments, such as "you should keep promises". Normative propositions contrast with descriptive propositions, which express what is rather than what ought to be. The schools of cognitivism and non-cognitivism debate the existence of normative propositions. Non-cognitivism argues that normative sentences are neither true nor false and do not express propositions, for example, because they convey emotions rather than propositions.

A gappy proposition, also called an incomplete or unfilled proposition, is a statement whose subject matter is not properly specified, which results in an incomplete meaning. This can happen when the proposition involves an empty name, which does not refer to any real entity, such as the name Pegasus. Given the difficulties in assigning truth values to gappy propositions, philosophers debate whether they are propositions in the strict sense rather than other meaning contents. Temporal propositions, another type, are statements that refer to specific times, such as "the Berlin Wall fell in 1989". Propositions are also classified by the domain or field of inquiry to which they belong, such as mathematical, scientific, metaphysical, and theological propositions.

== Theories ==
Several theories of the nature and functions of propositions have been suggested. They seek to explain in what sense propositions exist, what roles they play, and whether they have an internal structure. Other questions address the relation of propositions to language, thought, truth, and the world.

=== Realism and anti-realism ===
Realism about propositions, also called propositionalism, is the view that propositions exist or form part of reality in the widest sense. Realism takes many forms. Reductive or assimilist versions explain propositions in terms of other entities. Some argue that propositions are sets of possible worlds, while others characterize them as structured entities, properties, act types, or states of affairs. Non-reductive or non-assimilist theories reject these proposals. They assert that propositions are sui generis: a unique type of entity. They hold that other entities cannot play the roles assigned to propositions, for example, that sets or act types fail to explain how propositions bear truth values or represent reality. Another distinction is between robust and moderate realism. According to robust realism, propositions exist independently of linguistic, psychological, and semantic practices. Moderate realists maintain that propositions exist in a weaker sense as certain aspects associated with language or thought, implying that there would be no propositions without linguistic or cognitive activities.

Realism contrasts with anti-realism, which denies the existence of propositions. Anti-realists provide alternative explanations of proposition-related phenomena. For example, they may assert that other entities act as truth-bearers or propose ways to explain shared sentence meanings and belief contents that do not require propositions. Some anti-realists reject any talk of propositions, while others treat them as theoretically useful fictions that reveal patterns and simplify explanations but are not fundamental features of reality.

Various arguments for and against realism are discussed in the academic literature. Proponents hold that propositions are essential to the understanding of various phenomena: they explain how two sentences can mean the same thing, how a common content underlies cross-linguistic communication, and how people can share beliefs. Another line of argument appeals to linguistic evidence. For example, the sentence "the proposition that the earth is round is uncontroversial" explicitly refers to a proposition, thereby indicating its existence. Several types of expressions may designate propositions, including that-clauses, definite descriptions, and singular terms. Critics contend that these phenomena and linguistic devices can be explained without positing propositions, implying that propositions are methodologically unnecessary and ontologically redundant. Other objections focus on theoretical difficulties and paradoxes associated with propositions, such as the liar paradox.

=== Possible worlds ===
According to possible worlds semantics, a proposition is the set of possible worlds in which it is true. Possible worlds are shown as $w_1$, $w_2$, and so on. The blue area is the set of possible worlds corresponding to the proposition $P$.

Possible worlds semantics proposes a reductive realism that analyzes propositions as sets of possible worlds. A possible world is a complete way of how things could have been. For example, Paris is the capital of France in the actual world, but there are possible worlds where Nairobi is the capital of France. Accordingly, the sentence "Nairobi is the capital of France" is true in some possible worlds and false in others. Possible worlds semantics states that a proposition is the set of all possible worlds in which it is true since it expresses information that they all have in common. A key intuition underlying this approach is that propositions carry information that eliminates certain possibilities and thereby reduces the number of ways of how the world could be. The more information a proposition carries, the fewer possible worlds it contains. A closely related conception defines propositions as functions rather than sets. It asserts that each proposition is a function that takes a possible world as input and yields a truth value as output. This approach is based on the idea that a proposition may be true in one world and false in another, meaning that propositions are not true or false in an absolute sense but only relative to possible worlds.

One formal argument for the set-based conception of propositions, developed by David Lewis and Robert Stalnaker, assumes that propositions are properties of the possible worlds where they are true. If a property is identified with the set of entities to which it applies, it follows that propositions are sets of possible worlds. Other arguments for the possible worlds view point to its mathematical precision, formal simplicity, and explanatory power.

One difficulty for the possible worlds view comes from necessary propositions, such as "$2 + 2 = 4$" and "there are infinitely many prime numbers". A proposition is necessary if it is true in all possible worlds, meaning that it is equivalent to the set of all possible worlds. As a result, all necessary propositions are identical since they all correspond to the same set, which implies that there is only a single necessary proposition. Opponents argue that this is false since different necessary propositions express distinct ideas. For example, a person may know one necessary proposition but be ignorant of another. Critics conclude that the possible worlds view is too coarse-grained to capture these distinctions. (Note: One response to this problem proposes a modified definition that relies on both possible and impossible worlds.) Other objections question the existence of possible worlds or hold that sets cannot perform the role of propositions since sets cannot be true or false.

Another set-based proposal relies on the concept of truthmakers rather than possible worlds. A truthmaker of a proposition is an entity that makes the proposition true: if the entity exists, then it is responsible for the proposition being true. On this view, a proposition is a set of possible truthmakers. The theory is based on the idea that truth conditions are essential to a proposition: the proposition describes the conditions of what the world is like, and it is true if the world fulfills those conditions. The set of possible truthmakers encodes the truth condition of the proposition. Unlike the possible worlds view, this approach can distinguish necessary propositions: even propositions that are true in all possible worlds can still have different truthmakers.

=== Internal structure ===
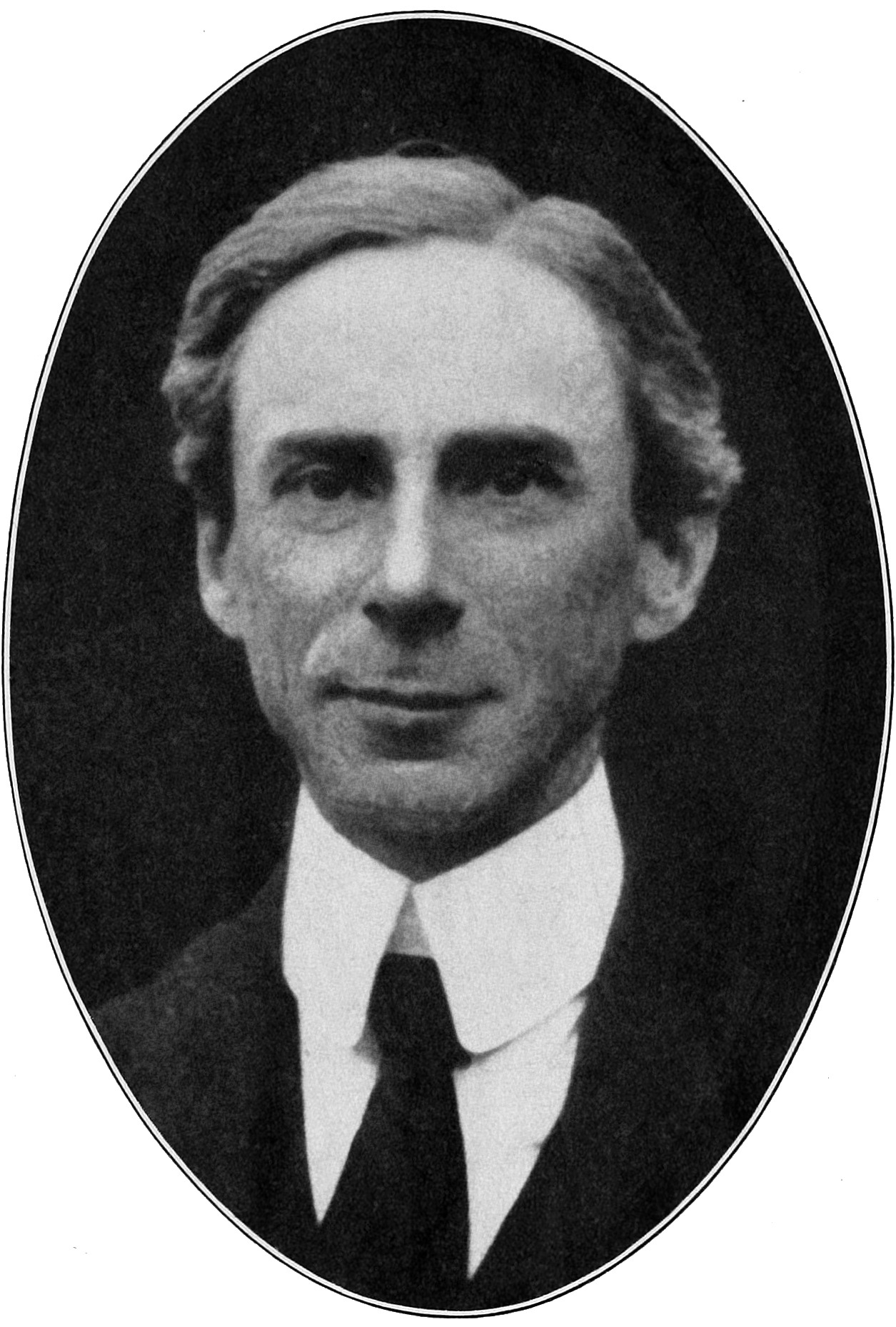
According to Bertrand Russell, propositions are structured entities, composed of individuals and concepts.

The structured proposition view is another approach that avoids some of the difficulties encountered by the possible worlds view. It suggests that propositions are complex entities in which parts are combined in a certain manner, resulting in an internal structure rather than an unordered set. A key motivation for this view is that propositions are the meanings of declarative sentences, which have an internal structure: they are made up of words that form a sequence following the rules of grammar. According to this view, the parts of a sentence have their own meanings, for example, a name may refer to a person, and a verb can designate an activity. The semantic value of a sentence—the proposition it expresses—is then understood as a function of the semantic values of its parts and their arrangement.

This idea is closely related to the principle of compositionality: the theory that the meaning of a compound expression is determined by the meanings of its parts and the way they are combined. According to this principle, one can understand the sentence "Tina is happy" by knowing English grammar and the meanings of the words "Tina", "is", and "happy", even if one has never encountered this specific combination of words before. The principle of compositionality explains how knowledge of a limited number of words and rules makes it possible to comprehend an infinite number of sentences.

Bertrand Russell formulated an influential view of structured propositions. He argued that propositions like "Jason loves Patty" are made up of the individuals they refer to (Jason and Patty) and the properties or relations they instantiate (love). A slightly different proposal by Gottlob Frege distinguishes between individuals and the way they are presented. According to this view, modes of presentation rather than individuals make up propositions. For Frege, the sentences "the morning star is a planet" and "the evening star is a planet" express two different propositions, whereas for Russell, they express the same proposition. The difference lies in the fact that morning star and evening star are different ways of presenting the same individual: the planet Venus. Other approaches to the internal structure of propositions have been suggested, including the idea that they are built up from functions.

A central topic for structured proposition views is the problem of unity: showing how the parts of propositions fuse together into a single entity that represents the world and can be true or false. A related difficulty is to explain how different propositions can have the same constituents, such as the contrast between "Jason loves Patty" and "Patty loves Jason". Instrumentalism about structured propositions is a view that seeks to bypass difficulties of the structured proposition view. It asserts that structural analysis is a useful theoretical tool for understanding certain aspects of propositions but does not reveal their intrinsic nature.

=== Ontological categories ===
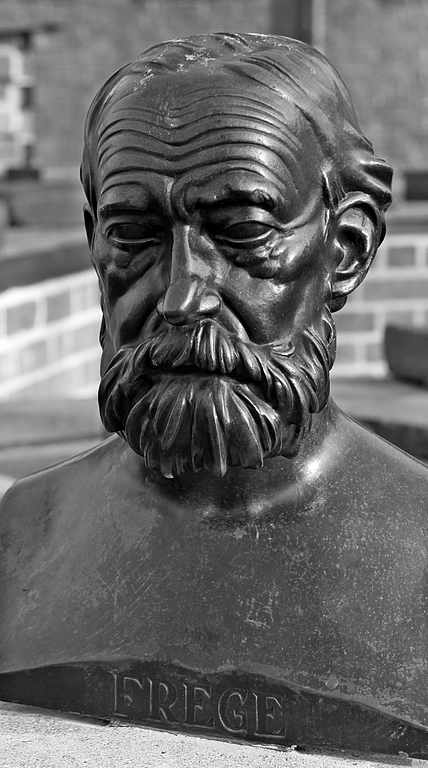
Gottlob Frege argued that propositions are abstract objects, existing independently of mental and linguistic activities.

Many other theories of the nature and ontological category of propositions have been proposed. Property-based views argue that propositions are properties. Properties are features of entities describing characteristics, such as the properties of being green and being spherical. According to one proposal, propositions are atypical properties of the form being such that trees are green. These properties, called Cambridge properties, describe the world at large rather than the characteristics of their bearers. True Cambridge properties are instantiated by every entity, and false ones are instantiated by none. A related property-based proposal asserts that a proposition is not a property of an individual thing but of a possible world since it describes what the world as a whole is like.

A similar approach characterizes propositions as a special type of relation. Relations are ways of how entities stand to each other. The relation is larger than is a two-place relation since it connects two entities, a larger one and a smaller one. If one of its positions is fixed, as in is larger than the Moon, it becomes a one-place relation or a property. If the other position is also fixed, as in Jupiter is larger than the Moon, it becomes a zero-place relation without any open positions. The relation-based view argues that simple propositions are zero-place relations, meaning that propositions are fully saturated relational states that either obtain or fail to obtain. A related suggestion identifies true propositions with facts or states of affairs. According to this view, sentences and beliefs represent reality, and propositions are what is represented, meaning that propositions are not themselves representations in a strict sense.

Another discussion concerns the ontological domain to which propositions belong. Following the Platonist ideas of Bernard Bolzano and Gottlob Frege, propositions have often been treated as abstract objects that have no causal effects and exist outside space and time. According to this view, propositions like "there are rocks" exist independently of any mental activity and would be true even if there were no humans. However, theoretical difficulties associated with abstract objects, such as the problem of explaining how knowledge of abstract objects is possible, have prompted philosophers to seek alternative conceptions. In response, naturalist theories have characterized propositions as mental or linguistic entities.

One approach of this form defines propositions in relation to psychological activities that represent the world, such as perceptions and judgments. It distinguishes between individual mental acts and general types that apply to several acts, identifying propositions with those types. For example, if two persons judge the same proposition to be true, then their mental states belong to the same act type corresponding to this proposition. This view argues that mental states have conditions of satisfaction that determine their accuracy, with truth corresponding to accurate psychological representation. Fictionalism, another theory, treats propositions as useful inventions that exist as aspects of linguistic frameworks. According to this view, propositions depend on language and have no independent existence.

=== Paradoxes ===
The liar paradox involves a proposition with an inconsistent truth assignment: if it is true then it is false and if it is false then it is true.

The study of propositions also deals with paradoxes in which certain features of, or intuitions about, propositions lead to contradictory conclusions. For example, the liar paradox concerns propositions like "I am lying" or "this proposition is false". The paradox arises when trying to assign a truth value to such a proposition. If the proposition really is false, then it correctly describes itself and therefore must be true. Conversely, if the proposition is true, then it correctly asserts its own falsehood and must therefore be false.

The Curry paradox, another conundrum, also concerns a self-referential proposition. It involves a conditional statement that can be used to prove any proposition, such as the claim that $2+2=5$. It has the form "if this proposition is true, then $2+2=5$". If the conditional is true, then the antecedent is true, and it follows that $2+2=5$. If the conditional was false, then its antecedent would be false. However, a conditional with a false antecedent is automatically true. So in either case, it follows that $2+2=5$. Because the content of the second proposition does not matter for this deduction, it is possible to derive any arbitrary conclusion this way, including that pigs can fly or that the Moon is made of cheese.

The Russell-Myhill paradox involves a contradiction about propositions that describe classes of true propositions. The contradiction arises when one adds the requirement that the proposition describing this class is not itself a member of the class, with the paradoxical result that the proposition is only included if it is not included. Other paradoxes concern propositions that deal with beliefs and references to different times. The truth regress is another proposition-related phenomenon, but it is usually not treated as a paradox in the strict sense. It is the observation that any true proposition generates an infinite regress: if the proposition "P" is true, then it is also the case that "it is true that P", "it is true that it is true that P", and so on, yielding infinitely many true statements. A similar regress in classical logic arises from double negation: if the proposition "P" is true, then it is also the case that "not not P", "not not not not P", and so forth. Philosophers debate how these regresses affect meaning and truth and whether they exist primarily on the level of sentences or propositions.

=== Other theories ===
Temporalism and eternalism disagree about the relation between truth and time. According to temporalism, the truth value of propositions is time-dependent and may change as reality changes. For example, the sentence "Richard Nixon is the US president" was true in 1971 but is false in 2025. Eternalism accepts that sentences may change their truth value but rejects that the same is possible for propositions: it argues that the truth value of a proposition is permanent and stays the same independently of any real-world changes. According to this view, the sentence "Richard Nixon is the US president" expresses one proposition when uttered in 1971 and a different proposition when uttered in 2025, meaning that the shift in sentence truth value corresponds to a difference in proposition. A related issue is the problem of future contingents: whether propositions about future events, such as "there will be a sea battle tomorrow", have truth values. If they do, this could indicate that future events are already predetermined in some sense. If they do not, it poses the problem of explaining how truth-value gaps are possible.

Abundant conceptions of propositions assert that all well-formed declarative sentences express propositions. Sparse conceptions suggest that this may not be generally the case. For example, moral non-cognitivists accept a sparse conception, arguing that some moral statements do not express propositions since they are neither true nor false.

Hyperintensional theories introduce fine-grained distinctions between propositions. For them, two propositions can have different truth values even when they are made up of necessarily equivalent parts. For example, the propositions "he has a 40% chance of succeeding" and "he has a 60% chance of failing" are necessarily equivalent. However, a person may believe one and not the other, indicating a difference in meaning. One approach to hyperintensionality, called two-dimensional semantics, associates two distinct propositions with the same declarative sentence corresponding to different ways of how it can be interpreted.

=== History ===
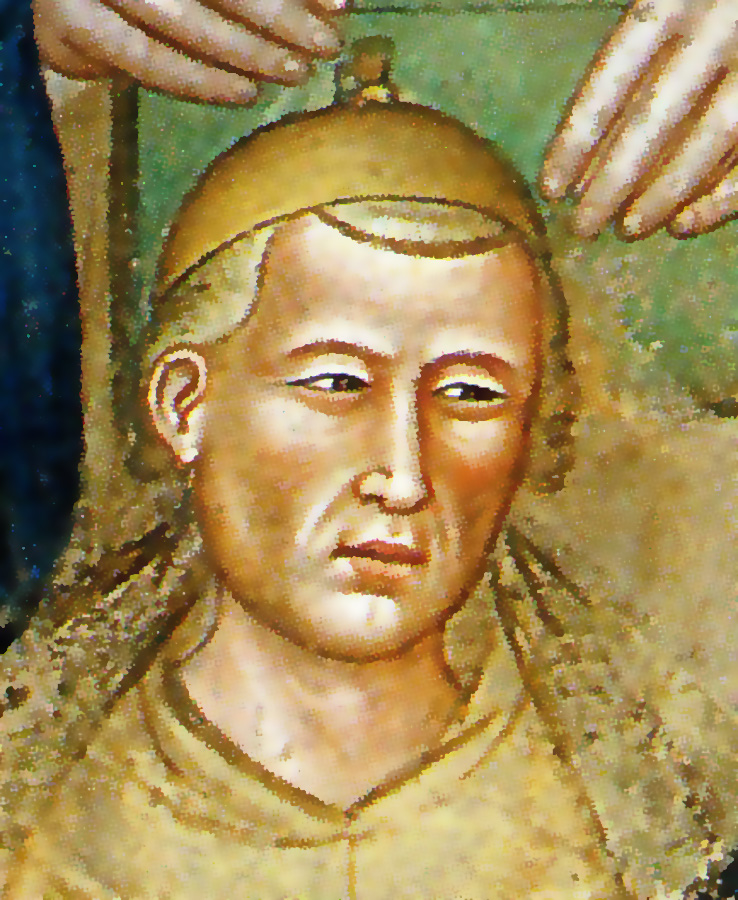
William of Ockham understood propositions as psychological representations formulated in a mental language.

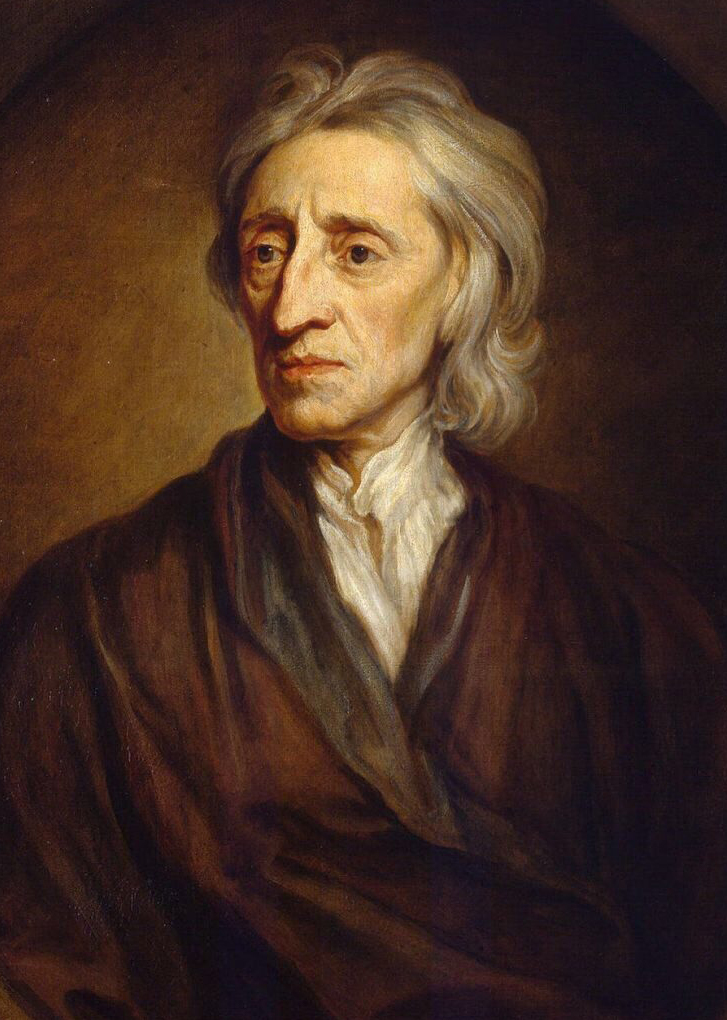
John Locke saw mental propositions as the primary truth-bearers and the meanings of verbal propositions.

The study of propositions has its origin in antiquity, emerging from discussions about the nature of belief, assertion, truth, and related paradoxes. In ancient Greek philosophy, one topic was the nature of false beliefs, in particular, whether they have an object since they fail to describe reality. Plato (c. 428 – c. 348 BCE) argued that they do since they refer to real entities and features. He explained their falsehood as an incorrect combination of these aspects rather than a failure of reference. His student Aristotle (384–322 BCE) formulated the correspondence theory of truth. He developed a logical system of different types of propositions, each composed of a subject, a predicate, and a copula; and studied the inferential relations between them. Aristotle defended temporalism, asserting that the truth of a proposition is not fixed but can change with time.

As part of Hellenistic philosophy, Stoicism emerged around 300 BCE and articulated a comprehensive theory of propositions, distinguishing between the utterance of a sentence, its meaning, and the reality it describes. The meaning, called lekton, was understood as the primary truth bearer in the form of a non-bodily content that different people can share. Stoic philosophy agreed with Aristotle that truth can change and defended the principle of bivalence, according to which every proposition is either true or false at a specific time with no exceptions. In ancient Chinese philosophy, starting in the 5th century BCE, Mohism explored the norms of correct judgments and the underlying practical skill of drawing distinctions. In ancient India, the school of Nyaya, which arose around 200 CE, studied the meanings of sentences, which it associated with mental judgments, and examined their truth conditions.

Medieval philosophers discussed whether propositions have substantial reality and whether they exist as acts of thinking, concrete facts, or universals. William of Ockham (c. 1287 – c. 1347 CE) proposed that they are individual mental representations. Ockham argued that thoughts happen in a mental language, with propositions corresponding to mental sentences. He understood propositions as the meanings of verbal sentences, as the bearers of truth values, and as the objects of attitudes like belief. In Islamic philosophy, al-Farabi (c. 870 – c. 950 CE) argued that simple concepts can be true or false, meaning that propositions are not the only truth bearers, a view later challenged by Avicenna (c. 980–1037 CE).

In early modern philosophy, René Descartes (1596–1650) saw individual acts of judgment as the main bearers of truth values. John Locke (1632–1704) advanced a similar mind-centered view, distinguishing verbal from mental propositions. For him, verbal propositions are combinations of words and signify mental propositions, which are combinations of ideas. According to this view, verbal propositions are true or false in a derivative sense: they get their truth values from the mental propositions they express. (Note: Interpreters debate whether Locke's mental propositions are judgments that automatically endorse a view or neutral contents that can be entertained without endorsement.) Gottfried Wilhelm Leibniz (1646–1716) rejected the idea that propositions exist as aspects of finite minds. He characterized them instead as contents of possible cognitions that are eternally present in the mind of God. Immanuel Kant (1724–1804) proposed a classification of judgments encompassing twelve categories. He also explored the distinctions between a priori and a posteriori and between analytic and synthetic propositions.

Unlike many of his predecessors, Bernard Bolzano (1781–1848) conceptualized propositions or sentences in themselves as non-mental, non-linguistic entities. According to him, they are the primary bearers of truth but do not exist in a substantial sense since they have no causal effects. Influenced by Bolzano, Franz Brentano (1838–1917) and his students examined the nature of propositional attitudes and the ontological status of their contents. Like Bolzano, Gottlob Frege (1848–1925) rigorously distinguished the psychological activity of thinking from its contents, arguing that propositional contents exist in a third realm, neither physical nor mental. (Note: Frege referred to the mental activity as Denken (German for 'thinking') and to propositions, the abstract contents of this activity, as Gedanken (German for 'thoughts').) He explored how propositions are built up from parts and articulated two dimensions of meaning: sense and reference. Bertrand Russell (1872–1970) agreed with Frege that propositions are neither linguistic nor mental and have an internal structure. According to Russell, they are complex entities made up of concrete objects and concepts describing those objects. G. E. Moore (1873–1958) endorsed realism about propositions in his early philosophy but later grew skeptical of them, arguing that possible facts rather than propositions are the objects of attitudes like belief. Other developments in the 20th and early 21st centuries were the emergence of possible worlds semantics and renewed interest in the internal structure and ontological category of propositions.

== In various fields ==
=== Logic ===
Logic is the study of correct inferences and arguments. Propositions play a central role in this field since they act as the premises and conclusions of arguments and as the bearers of truth values. Logicians study how premises support conclusions in good arguments and how they fail to do so in fallacies. The strongest form of support is found in deductively valid arguments, in which the conclusion cannot be false if the premises are true. To study deductive validity, logicians analyze the logical form of propositions and arguments. The logical form of an argument is its underlying structure, independent of any concrete content, often expressed through rules of inference. For example, modus ponens is a rule of inference that links premises of the form "if $P$ then $Q$" and "$P$" to the conclusion "$Q$", such as the argument "If it rains, then the ground is wet. It rains. Therefore, the ground is wet." Other rules of inference include modus tollens and disjunctive syllogism. A closely related topic is logical truths: propositions that are true only because of their logical form. For instance, propositions of the form "if $P$ then $P$" are true independently of the content that $P$ stands for.

Truth table of some logical operators (Note: "T" stands for true and "F" stands for false. The first two columns are the input values for the simple propositions $P$ and $Q$. The following columns show how the truth values of different compound propositions depend on these input values.)
$P$	$Q$	$\lnot P$	$P \lor Q$	$P \to Q$
T	T	F	T	T
T	F	F	T	F
F	T	T	T	T
F	F	T	F	T

Formal systems are abstract frameworks for analyzing the structure of arguments. Propositional logic examines inferential patterns of simple and compound propositions. A compound proposition is made up of simpler propositions linked by logical operators, such as $\lnot$ (not), $\lor$ (or), and $\to$ (if ... then ...). For example, the proposition "if $P$ then $Q$" is made up of the simpler propositions $P$ and $Q$, connected with the conditional operator "if ... then ...". The logical operators in propositional logic are truth-functional, meaning that the truth value of a compound proposition only depends on the truth values of its constituent propositions. Truth tables display all possible combinations of truth values of simple propositions and show how they determine the truth values of compound propositions.

First-order logic extends propositional logic with additional devices to analyze the internal structure of propositions, including singular terms, predicates, and quantifiers. In this way, it articulates the logical form and inferential patterns of propositions such as "Lassie is a dog" and "all dogs are animals". Modal logics introduce operators to capture the logical form of propositions about topics such as what is possible and necessary, what is allowed and prohibited, what is believed, and what happened at different times.

Logicians and formal semanticists use semantic frameworks to analyze the meanings of expressions.

In addition to rules of inference, logicians and formal semanticists also devise semantic frameworks to analyze the meanings of logical formulas and natural language sentences and calculate their truth values. These frameworks usually involve an abstract model made up of mathematical objects grouped into sets. They also include rules of interpretation that relate expressions to these objects. For example, a simple framework for the proposition "Tina is happy" may map the singular term Tina to an object and the predicate happy to the set of all happy entities. This makes it possible to calculate the truth value of the proposition: it is true if the object mapped to the term Tina is a member of the set of happy entities.

=== Linguistics and philosophy of language ===
Linguistics and philosophy of language typically understand propositions as the meanings of declarative sentences. In this role, propositions are linked to truth conditions and explain how different sentences, such as translations and paraphrases, can have the same meaning. Linguistics and philosophy of language examine how the meaning of a sentence depends on the expressions it contains, what types of expressions there are, how they can be combined, and how the context of uttering a sentence shapes its meaning.

Ambiguous sentences express different propositions depending on how they are interpreted.

The study of propositions faces several theoretical difficulties associated with the connection between natural language and meaning, such as ambiguity, vagueness, and context-dependence. Sentences with ambiguous terms can have several competing meanings. For example, the sentence "Naomi went to the bank" can mean that she visited a financial institution or the side of a river, thereby expressing distinct propositions depending on the interpretation. Another problem is associated with vague terms, such as bald and tall. They pose challenges for determining the truth conditions of propositions about borderline cases where it is unclear whether the term applies. Sentences with non-referring terms, like the empty name Pegasus, raise similar issues about truth conditions, including the question of whether they express propositions at all.

Another studied phenomenon is context sensitivity, in which the meaning of a sentence depends on the situation in which it is used. For example, the sentence "it is raining" does not explicitly specify the time and location relevant to determining its truth value, which may be fixed by the context in which the sentence is used. Context sensitivity is also relevant to indexical terms, such as I, she, here, and now, which refer to different entities depending on the circumstances of the utterance. Factors that determine the meaning of context-sensitive expressions include the time and place of utterance, speaker intention, audience, and shared background knowledge.

Other challenges arise for the truth values of extensional and intensional sentences. A sentence is extensional if its truth value does not change when a term is replaced by a different term for the same entity. For instance, the sentence "Cicero was Roman" is extensional since one can replace the name Cicero with the alternative name Tully without changing the truth value. This is not generally possible for intensional sentences, such as propositional attitude reports. Propositional attitude reports describe someone's mental states, like the sentence "Elena believes that Cicero was Roman". This sentence is intensional since Elena may not know of Cicero's alternative name and thus might not believe that Tully was Roman. (Note: In some cases, it depends on the interpretation whether this type of substitution for propositional attitude reports is possible or not, such as the contrast between de dicto and de re interpretations.)

Linguistics and the philosophy of language also explore the relation between propositions and the meanings of non-declarative sentences, such as questions and commands. For example, inquisitive semantics is a framework that treats questions as inquisitive propositions, which encode information together with uncertainty expressed through choices between competing alternatives.

=== Psychology, cognitive science, and philosophy of mind ===
Psychology, cognitive science, and philosophy of mind are interested in propositions as the objects of mental states, called propositional attitudes, such as beliefs. For example, if Ivan believes that roses are red, this is interpreted as a belief-attitude toward the propositional content "roses are red". Propositional attitudes are not limited to beliefs but can take many forms, such as doubts, desires, and intentions. (Note: According to one proposal, there are only two basic attitudes: beliefs and desires. This view argues that all other propositional attitudes can be interpreted as a combination of those two. For example, one form of belief-desire theory analyzes an intention to do something as a desire to perform a specific action together with a belief that one will do it.)

Propositional attitudes can operate consciously, like when actively considering a statement, but can also be unconscious, such as a repressed desire or a belief stored in long-term memory. Propositional states contrast with non-propositional or qualitative states, which involve sensory experiences or feelings without a propositional structure. Suggested examples include the experiences of pain, color, and sound. However, the precise boundary between propositional and non-propositional states is disputed. For example, philosophers debate whether perception should be analyzed as a purely qualitative process because of its sensory nature, or as a propositional process whose contents can be true or false. Psychological propositionalism is the view that all intentional states involve propositional attitudes. A mental state is intentional if it refers to something or represents the world in some way, as is the case for perceptions and desires. Propositionalism contrasts with objectualism, which asserts that the contents of some intentional states are objects rather than propositions. According to one version of objectualism, object-focused desires, like a desire for ice cream, have no propositional contents.

Another distinction in philosophy of mind and epistemology is between propositional and non-propositional knowledge. Propositional knowledge is a propositional attitude directed at facts, like knowing that water freezes at 0°C. Non-propositional knowledge includes practical knowledge, such as knowing how to swim, and knowledge by acquaintance, like knowing a celebrity personally.

Psychology, neuroscience, and cognitive science rely on empirical methods to study proposition-related phenomena. For example, they explore mental processes involved in the production and understanding of language, how thoughts transform information, and how propositional knowledge is stored and accessed in long-term memory. Computer scientists explore how these and similar processes can be simulated using computers, covering topics such as knowledge representation and automated reasoning.
