= Two-dimensionalism =

Approach to semantics in analytic philosophy

Two-dimensionalism is an approach to semantics in analytic philosophy. It is a theory of how to determine the sense and reference of a word and the truth-value of a sentence. It is intended to resolve the puzzle: How is it possible to discover empirically that a necessary truth is true? Two-dimensionalism provides an analysis of the semantics of words and sentences that makes sense of this possibility. The theory was first developed by Robert Stalnaker, but it has been advocated by numerous philosophers since, including David Chalmers.

== Two-dimensional semantic analysis ==
According to two-dimensionalism, any statement, for example "Water is H_{2}O", is taken to express two distinct propositions, often referred to as a primary intension and a secondary intension, which together compose its meaning.

The primary intension of a word or sentence is its sense, i.e., is the idea or method by which we find its referent. In other words, it's how we identify something in any possible world before knowing its actual nature. The primary intension of "water" might be a description, such as watery stuff or "the clear, drinkable liquid that fills oceans and lakes." The entity identified by this intension could vary in different hypothetical worlds. In the twin Earth thought experiment, for example, inhabitants might use "water" to mean their equivalent of water, even if its chemical composition is not H_{2}O but XYZ. Thus, for that world, "water" does not refer to H_{2}O.

The secondary intension of "water" is whatever "water" refers to in this world. It's determined after we discover water's actual composition in our world. So, if we assign "water" the primary intension watery stuff, then the secondary intension of "water" is H_{2}O, since H_{2}O is watery stuff in this world. The secondary intension of "water" in our world is H_{2}O, which is H_{2}O in every world because unlike watery stuff it is impossible for H_{2}O to be other than H_{2}O. When considered according to its secondary intension, "Water is H_{2}O" is true in every world. This explains how "water is XYZ" can be conceivable (using the primary intension) but not possible in this world (using the secondary intension). Or in simpler words, water could conceivably be composed of molecules other than H_{2}O, but is actually not.

== Impact ==
If two-dimensionalism is workable it solves some very important problems in the philosophy of language. Saul Kripke has argued that "Water is H_{2}O" is an example of a necessary truth which is true a posteriori, since we had to discover that water was H_{2}O, but given that it is true (which it is) it cannot be false. It would be absurd to claim that something that is water is not H_{2}O, for these are known to be identical.

However, this contention that one and the same proposition can be both a posteriori and necessary is considered absurd by some philosophers (as is Kripke's paired claim that the same proposition can be both a priori and contingent).

For example, Robert Stalnaker's account of knowledge represents knowledge as a relation on possible worlds, which entails that it is impossible for a proposition to fail to be a priori given that it is necessary. This can be proven as follows: If a proposition P is necessary it is true in all possible worlds. If P is true at all possible worlds and what we know are sets of possible worlds, then it is not possible not to know that P, for P is the case at all possible worlds in the set of worlds that we know. So if P is necessary then we know it necessarily, and ipso facto we know it a priori.

Under two-dimensionalism, the problem disappears. The primary intension of "Water is H_{2}O" is the a posteriori component, since it is contingent that the referent of "water" is H_{2}O, while the secondary intension is the necessary component of the sentence, since it is necessary that the stuff we in fact call water is H_{2}O. Neither intension gives us both a necessary and an a posteriori component. But one gets the false impression that the sentence expresses a necessary a posteriori proposition because this single sentence expresses two propositions, one a posteriori and one necessary.

=== In the philosophy of mind ===
Two-dimensional semantics has been used by David Chalmers to counter objections to the various arguments against materialism in the philosophy of mind. Specifically, Chalmers deploys two-dimensional semantics to "bridge the (gap between) epistemic and modal domains" in arguing from knowability or epistemic conceivability to what is necessary or possible (modalities).

The reason Chalmers employs two-dimensional semantics is to avoid objections to conceivability implying possibility. For instance, it's claimed that we can conceive of water not having been H_{2}O, but it's not possible that water isn't H_{2}O. Chalmers replies that it is 1-possible that water wasn't H_{2}O because we can imagine another substance XYZ with watery properties, but it's not 2-possible. Hence, objections to conceivability implying possibility are unfounded when these words are used more carefully.

Chalmers then advances the following "two-dimensional argument against materialism". Define P as all physical truths about the universe and Q as a truth about phenomenal experience, such as that someone is conscious. Let "1-possible" refer to possibility relative to primary intension and "2-possible" relative to secondary intension.

1. P&~Q is conceivable [i.e., zombies are conceivable]
2. If P&~Q is conceivable, then P&~Q is 1-possible
3. If P&~Q is 1-possible, then P&~Q is 2-possible or Russellian monism is true.
4. If P&~Q is 2-possible, materialism is false.
5. Materialism is false or Russellian monism is true.

== Criticism ==
Scott Soames is a notable opponent of two-dimensionalism, which he sees as an attempt to revive Russelian–Fregean descriptivism and to overturn what he sees as a "revolution" in semantics begun by Kripke and others. Soames argues that two-dimensionalism stems from a misreading of passages in Kripke (1980) as well as Kaplan (1989).

== Sources ==
- Garcia-Carpintero, Manuel (2006). Two-Dimensional Semantics. Oxford: Clarendon Press. ISBN 0-19-927202-6.
- Chalmers, David (2010). The Character of Consciousness. Oxford University Press. ISBN 978-0-19-531110-5.
