= Kent Bach =

American philosopher

Kent Bach (born 1943) is an American philosopher and Professor of Philosophy at San Francisco State University. His primary areas of research include the philosophy of language, linguistics and epistemology. He is the author of three books: Exit-existentialism: A philosophy of self-awareness, Linguistic Communication and Speech Acts, and Thought and Reference published by Wadsworth, the MIT Press, and Oxford University Press, respectively.

== Philosophy of language ==
Bach's writings in the philosophy of language have tended to focus on the problems and puzzles that arise from so-called propositional attitude attributions, in particular belief attributions. Such attributions (or reports) take the form A believes that p where A is the subject to whom a belief is attributed and p represents the sentence, proposition (or, more vaguely still, content) that is supposed to be believed by A.

In A Puzzle About Belief Reports and Do Belief Reports Report Beliefs?, Bach argues that there is a false assumption underlying all of the traditional forms of explanation of the nature of belief reports: they all implicitly endorse something that he refers to as the Specification Assumption. This is basically the idea that the "that"- clauses of belief reports ("that William will take the train tomorrow", "that the sun will rise tomorrow morning") specify (i.e. directly refer to) propositions (or sentences) that the believer believes. Bach suggests that "that"-clauses do not specify but merely "describe" or "characterize" what a person believes.

He argues his thesis by first invoking several classic puzzles which have confounded philosophers of language since the time of Frege. The first type of puzzle is a variation on the classic problem of the substitution of co-referential terms in the context of attitude attributions. A simple illustration is the following pair of sentences:

1. Lois Lane believes that Clark Kent is a wimp.
2. Lois Lane believes that Superman is a wimp.

The simple substitution of one co-referring term for another would seem to transform the truth-value (and hence the content) of the sentence from true to false. But this should be impossible if we are faithful to a few simple and reasonable assumptions that are commonly accepted among philosophers: direct reference, semantic compositionality and semantic innocence. Direct reference is the principle that singular terms contribute their referents to the propositions expressed by the sentences which contain them. Compositionality is the ideas that the meaning of a composite expression is derived from the parts which make it up. Semantic innocence is the principle that "embedding" a term or name in a "that" clause should not change its semantic value.

Given these basic assumptions how is it possible that the truth value of a sentence in the context of an attribution can change - that is, how is semantic opacity possible? Bach sketches four historical approaches to the resolving the problem and demonstrates each of their inadequacies. The first approach is that of Frege himself. Frege claimed that the reference of a term in the context of a belief report (or any other attitude attribution) was no longer its "customary" reference but rather its sense (see sense and reference). While this proposal maintains compositionality, however, it obviously violates the aforementioned principle of semantic innocence. Terms do not have the same reference in attitude attribution contexts that they do in ordinary sentence contexts. Bach illustrates why this is a problem by providing an example sentence that involves anaphora and that leads to serious problems for the Fregean view:

(An)Lois Lane believes that Clark Kent is a wimp, but he is not.

Here, the pronoun he is being used, as linguists say, anaphorically: its meaning is derived from the proper name which it is standing in for (in this case, Clark Kent). It seems clear, then, that the "he" used in this sentence refers (and quite directly) to Clark Kent. Frege's theory would predict that it refers to the name Clark Kent, the sense of the term in the terminology of Frege. Consequently, Frege's theory "denies semantic innocence" and this makes it ring somewhat counterintuitive.

Bach next considers what he calls, the metalinguistic or sententialist view. On this view, a sentence embedded in a "that"-clause refers to some sort of sentence, whether the sentence itself or a sentence in some language of thought depends on the specifics of the theory. However that may be, this view also violates the principle of semantic innocence: the referents of terms change from ordinary contexts (where they are objects in the external world) to attitude report contexts (where they are linguistic items. Hence, it has the same problem as Frege's, as well as several others.

The so-called hidden indexical theory maintains that the difference in truth value (and content) between sentences 1 and 2 above has nothing to do with what they say about what Lois Lane believes, but with what they implicitly say about how she believes it. The two sentences do not differ in their contents, the singular proposition expressed by the statement that Superman/Clark Kent is a wimp, but by some implicitly referred to way of taking the proposition. In Bach's view this approach violates the principle of compositionality. There is no syntactical place in the sentence A believes that G is F for some "unarticulated constituent" or "hidden indexical". He also points out that sentences such as "Joe is ready" and "Fred has finished", which are missing an argument, are not necessarily sentences that express propositions with unarticulated constituents. They may simply be semantically incomplete and hence not express propositions at all.

The last position that Bach considers is the so-called neo-Russelian theory. Neo-Russelians attempt to solve the problem by rejecting the "anti-substitution intuition". They insist that sentences such as 1 and 2 actually have the same contents and that there is no transformation in truth values at all. Similarly, if the Joker realizes that Bruce Wayne is rich is true, then it is also true that the Joker realizes that Batman is rich; if the Joker doubts that Bruce Wayne is a threat is true, then so is the statement that the Joker doubts that Batman is a threat and so forth. These consequences make the neo-Rusellian theory seem extremely awkward and counterintuitive.

Bach's own, alternative solution is to reject the Specification Assumption discussed at the beginning. He further illustrates the problems associated with this assumption by way of another famous philosophical puzzle: Kripke's Paderewski puzzle, which does not involve substitution.

(a)Peter believes that Paderewski had musical talent.
(b)Peter disbelieves that Paderewski had musical talent.

Kripke's puzzle arises from the fact that Peter takes Paderewski to be two different individuals: one a statesman and the other a pianist. In fact, they are one and the same person. According to Bach's descriptivist view, sentence a here describes Peter as believing something and sentence b describes him as believing something else. Since the "that"-clauses do not specify what the two things are that Peter believes (they do not refer to one specific object), then they are not necessarily the same thing. The condition for the truth of a belief report is that the believer must believe something such that the proposition expressed by the "that" clause turns out to be true.

Attempts have been made to resolve the Paderewski puzzle by suggesting that the "that"-clauses involved are not sufficiently specific and that if all contextually relevant information were provided in detail, then we could eventually determine exactly what it is that Peter believes and disbelieves. However, as Bach shows, this leads to an infinite regress. We could add information to the sentences a and b which further specifies that Peter believes that Paderewski "the pianist" has musical talent and Peter disbelieves that Paderewski "the statesman" has musical talent. But let us suppose that Peter hears a recording of Paderewski playing Mozart and is impressed with the performance. Later, he hears a recording of Paderewski playing Keith Jarret and is disgusted by the performance. Given that we have the same individual Paderewski and that Peter still does not know that it is the same individual in the two cases, we would have to say that Peter believes that Paderewski the "classical pianist" has musical talent and that Peter disbelieves that Paderewski the "jazz pianist" has musical talent. This specification might not suffice either. Suppose that Peter now hears Paderewski play Beethoven and is not impressed. We would have to say Peter believes that Paderewki "the classical pianist playing Mozart"...". As Bach puts it, "[that clauses] are not inherently capable of specifying their contents fully".

In his paper, Content Ex Machina Bach argues against over-interpreting what he labels the "contextualist platitude" which he defines as: “Generally what a speaker means in uttering a sentence, even if the sentence is devoid of ambiguity, vagueness, or indexicality, goes beyond what the sentence means.” Bach asserts that context does not establish meaning but is merely one of several conversational principles. He states that “context does not determine (in the sense of constitute), but merely enables the hearer to determine (in the sense of ascertain) what the speaker means.” Context provides constraints on what a speaker can reasonably mean and on what a hearer can reasonably interpret a speaker to mean. “contextualist platitude” does not preclude the “older picture of language and communication” and “a fairly standard semantic-pragmatic distinction.” Pragmatic considerations and context do not contribute to the content of what is said. Bach admits that there is meaning in utterances beyond the semantic content of a sentence, but he maintains that context does not determine speaker meaning but rather constrains how a speaker can expect to be understood and helps the hearer understand what is said. “We need the level of locutionary act and, correlatively, a strict, semantic notion of what is said in order to account for (the content of) what a speaker does in uttering a sentence independently of whatever communicative intention (if any) he has in uttering it and regardless of how the content of that intention may depart from the semantic content of the sentence.”

== Reliabilism ==
In his paper, "A Rationale for Reliabilism," Bach weighs in on the debate between internalist and externalist theories of justification by introducing a distinction between justified belief and justified believers. According to Bach, “a belief can be justified even in the absence of any action on the part of the believer, as in the case of beliefs formed automatically or routinely without any deliberate consideration;” whereas “a person is justified in believing something to the extent that he holds the belief rationally and responsibly.” On this view, the root of the debate over what constitutes justification between internalists and externalists is that internalists are interested in what makes a believer justified and externalists are concerned with what makes a belief justified.

Bach argues that the reasoning method employed by humans is default reasoning, which is to say that when humans reason, many steps in their reasoning are taken by default- i.e. they are “based on some generalization or stereotype which is overridden only if there occurs the thought of an alternative or of a reason to the contrary.” An example of this would be seeing an apple on the table. Bach would argue that, under normal circumstances, the belief “there is an apple on the table” will be formed without reflection on the process by which that belief was formed since the reasoning process of the agent that sees the apple is working under the assumption that seeing something means it is there. Given this, Bach holds that the internalist is expecting too much for a belief to be justified, since expecting reasoning to be evaluated in every step would mean denying justification to the large majority of beliefs since they are formed via default reasoning. Bach therefore holds that if internalism cannot provide a solid argument against the default reasoning model of human cognition, then they must be satisfied in defining what a justified believer is, leaving the question of justified belief to the externalist.

Bach presents his own theory as to what constitutes justified belief which he calls the “taking-for-granted principle.” This principle holds that:

it appearing to one that p justifies directly inferring that p provided that (a) it does not occur to one that the situation might be out of the ordinary, and (b) it probably would occur to one that the situation might be out of the ordinary.

== Bach versus Fodor ==
In his Review of Concepts: Where Cognitive Science Went Wrong, Bach takes Jerry Fodor to task for his criticisms of lexical semantics and polysemy. Fodor claims that there is no lexical structure to such verbs as "keep", "get", "make" and "put". He suggests that, alternatively, "keep" simply expresses the concept KEEP (Fodor capitalizes concepts to distinguish them from properties, names or other such entities). If there is a straightforward one-to-one mapping between individual words and concepts, "keep your clothes on"*, "keep your receipt" and "keep washing your hands" will all share the same concept of KEEP under Fodor's theory. This concept presumably locks on to the unique external property of keeping. But, if this is true, then RETAIN must pick out a different property in RETAIN YOUR RECEIPT, since one can't retain one's clothes or retain washing one's hands. Fodor's theory also has a problem explaining how the concept FAST contributes, differently, to the contents of FAST CAR, FAST DRIVER, FAST TRACK, and FAST TIME. Whether or not the differing interpretations of "fast" in these sentences are specified in the semantics of English, or are the result of pragmatic inference, is a matter of debate.

What makes Fodor's view of concepts extremely difficult to digest for many critics is simply his insistence that such a large, perhaps implausible, number of them are primitive and undefinable. For example, Fodor considers such concepts as BACHELOR, EFFECT, ISLAND, TRAPEZOID, VIXEN, and WEEK to be all primitive, innate and unanalyzable because they all fall into the category of what he calls "lexical concepts" (those for which our language has a single word). Against this view, Bach argues that the concept VIXEN is almost certainly composed out of the concepts FEMALE and FOX, BACHELOR out of SINGLE and MALE, and so on.

== Books ==
- Bach, Kent, Exit-existentialism;: A philosophy of self-awareness, Wadsworth Pub. Co, 1973. ISBN 0-534-00309-5
- Bach, Kent and Harnish, Robert M., Linguistic Communication and Speech Acts, The MIT Press, 1982. ISBN 0-262-52078-8
- Bach, Kent, Thought and Reference, Oxford University Press. ISBN 0-19-824077-5

== See also ==
- American philosophy
- List of American philosophers
