= The World Philosophy Made: From Plato to the Digital Age =

2019 book by Scott Soames

- Cover
- Author: Scott Soames
- Language: English
- Subject: History of philosophy
- Publisher: Princeton University Press
- Publication date: 2019
- Publication place: United States
- Media type: Print
- Pages: 444
- ISBN: 978-0-691-17692-5

The World Philosophy Made: From Plato to the Digital Age is a 2019 book by American philosopher Scott Soames, published by Princeton University Press. Through a historical survey, Soames presents Western philosophy as crucial to the intellectual and institutional foundations of science, mathematics, language, politics, law, and technology. Spanning from Ancient Greece to contemporary debates in the digital era, Soames argues that philosophy has not merely reflected but actively reconstituted our intellectual, social, and institutional life. He contends that philosophical concepts and methods have been foundational to the development of rational inquiry, democratic governance, and the pursuit of meaning.

== Author ==
In a 2020 interview on the New Books Network, Soames discussed his book and emphasized philosophy's profound influence on various facets of modern life. He challenged the notion that philosophy is merely abstract or disconnected from practical concerns, and illustrated its foundational role in shaping disciplines such as science, law, politics, and technology. Soames traced the evolution of Western philosophy from ancient Greek thinkers like Plato and Aristotle through the medieval and early modern periods, culminating in contemporary analytic philosophy. He highlighted how philosophical inquiry has been instrumental in developing modern logic, the scientific method, and concepts of individual rights and democracy. For instance, he noted that advancements in logic and mathematics have underpinned the digital technologies integral to today's society. Soames underscored philosophy's role in fostering rational inquiry, which has led to significant progress in understanding language, cognition, and ethical frameworks. He argued that philosophical principles continue to inform debates on justice, morality, and the structure of democratic institutions.

== Summary ==
The book, divided into fourteen chapters, describes how Western philosophy has profoundly shaped various fields including science, politics, law, and culture. Soames argues that philosophical inquiry was pivotal not only for theoretical understanding but also in establishing foundational concepts essential for developments in diverse areas such as ethics, logic, mathematics, physics, cognitive science, and political institutions. Beginning with ancient Greece, he emphasizes the seminal contributions of Socrates, Plato, and Aristotle, crediting them with initiating a systematic approach to knowledge that replaced mythological explanation with rational investigation. Soames explores how medieval and Renaissance philosophers, notably Aquinas, reconciled philosophical reasoning with religious faith, enabling philosophical ideas to influence Christian theology profoundly. The book also examines how modern thinkers such as Descartes, Locke, Hume, Frege, Russell, and Gödel laid critical foundations for contemporary understandings in rational choice theory, linguistic analysis, logic, mathematics, and the digital revolution. In its concluding chapters, the book addresses contemporary philosophical engagements with normative and existential questions, analyzing ongoing debates about justice, moral objectivity, constitutional governance, and life's meaning.

== Reviews ==
Brendan Balcerak Jackson's review of the book offered both praise and critical analysis of the author's portrayal of philosophy's role in shaping human knowledge and society, from medieval times to contemporary issues. Jackson acknowledged Soames's success in demonstrating philosophy's influence across diverse areas of human life, particularly praising his detailed treatment of topics such as Gödel’s incompleteness theorem and Ramsey’s decision theory. However, Jackson questioned whether the book's extensive detail risked overwhelming readers new to philosophy, potentially undermining its educational aim.

Although Brendan Patrick Purdy critiques the omission of some important philosophical views, he concludes that "Soames demonstrates how philosophy shaped our world while at the same time developing a spectacular one-volume history of Western philosophy in the analytic tradition. On those grounds alone, that makes this work a profound achievement."
