= Mediated reference theory =

A mediated reference theory (also indirect reference theory) is any semantic theory that posits that words refer to something in the external world, but insists that there is more to the meaning of a name than simply the object to which it refers. It thus stands opposed to direct reference theory. Gottlob Frege is a well-known advocate of mediated reference theories. Similar theories were widely held in the middle of the twentieth century by philosophers such as Peter Strawson and John Searle.

Saul Kripke, a proponent of direct reference theory, in his Naming and Necessity dubbed mediated reference theory the Frege–Russell view and criticized it. Subsequent scholarship refuted the claim that Bertrand Russell's views on reference theory were the same as Frege's, since Russell was also a proponent of direct reference theory.

== See also ==
- Sense and reference
- Descriptivist theory of names
