= Direct reference theory =

Theory in philosophy of language

A direct reference theory (also called referentialism or referential realism) is a theory of language that claims that the meaning of a word or expression lies in what it points out in the world. The object denoted by a word is called its referent. Criticisms of this position are often associated with Ludwig Wittgenstein.

In the 19th century, mathematician and philosopher Gottlob Frege also argued against it, and contrasted it with mediated reference theory. In 1953, with his Philosophical Investigations, Wittgenstein argued against referentialism, famously saying that "the meaning of a word is its use." Direct reference theory is a position typically associated with logical positivism and analytical philosophy. Logical positivist philosophers in particular have significantly devoted their efforts in countering positions of the like of Wittgenstein's.

== John Stuart Mill ==
The philosopher John Stuart Mill was one of the earliest modern advocates of a direct reference theory beginning in 1843. In his A System of Logic Mill introduced a distinction between what he called "connotation" and "denotation". Connotation is a relation between a name (singular or general) and one or more attributes. For example, 'widow' denotes widows and connotes the attributes of being female, and of having been married to someone now dead. If a name is connotative, it denotes what it denotes in virtue of object or objects having the attributes the name connotes. Connotation thus determines denotation. The same object can, on the other hand, be denoted with several names with different connotations. A name can have connotation but no denotation. Connotation of a name, if it has one, can be taken to be its meaning in Mill.

In contrast to proper names, most individual concrete names, in Mill's opinion, are not connotative. Proper names, then, have no significance. On the other hand, all general phrases are connotative in Mill's view. Overall, Mill's argument is quite similar to the descriptive theory, with the exception of his view on proper names.

== Bertrand Russell ==
Saul Kripke, a proponent of direct reference theory, in his Naming and Necessity dubbed mediated reference theory the "Frege–Russell view" and criticized it (see below). Subsequent scholarship refuted the claim that Bertrand Russell's views on reference theory were the same as Gottlob Frege's, since Russell was also a proponent of direct reference theory.

== Saul Kripke ==
Saul Kripke defended direct reference theory when applied to proper names. Kripke claims that proper names do not have any "senses" at all, because senses only offer contingent facts about things. Ruth Barcan Marcus advanced a theory of direct reference for proper names at a symposium in which Quine and Kripke were participants: published in Synthese, 1961 with Discussion in Synthese 1962. She called directly referring proper names "tags" (see tag theory of names). Kripke urged such a theory in 1971 and thereafter. He called such directly referring proper names "rigid designators".

Kripke articulated this view using the formal apparatus of possible worlds. The possible worlds thought-experiment first takes the subject, and then tries to imagine the subject in other possible worlds. Taking George W. Bush, for example. First (1) the thought-experiment must state that the name "George W. Bush" is the name used to describe the particular individual man that is typically meant. Then (2), the experimenter must imagine the possible states of affairs that reality could have been - where Bush was not president, or went into a different career, was never born at all, etc. When this is done, it becomes obvious that the phrase "President of the United States in 2004" does not necessarily describe George W. Bush, because it is not necessarily true in all possible worlds; it only contingently describes him. By contrast, for instance, the word "apple" will always describe the same things across all possible worlds, because of premise (1). So use of the word "apple" to describe apples is true in all possible worlds.

Terms that are true across all possible worlds in this way are called "rigid designators".

== See also ==
- Causal theory of reference
- Contextualism and Context principle
- Descriptivist theory of names
- Entity realism
- Frege's puzzle
- Sense and reference
- The Meaning of Meaning
