= Exegetical neutrality =

Principle in translation

In translation, the principle of exegetical neutrality is that "if at any point in a text there is a passage that raises for the native speaker legitimate questions of exegesis, then, if at all possible, a translator should strive to confront the reader of his version with the same questions of exegesis and not produce a version which in his mind resolves those questions".
