= Scott Soames =

American philosopher (born 1945)

- Born: 1945 (age 80–81)

Education
- Education: Stanford University (BA); Massachusetts Institute of Technology (PhD, 1976)
- Thesis: A Critical Examination of Frege's Theory of Presupposition and Contemporary Alternatives (1976)
- Doctoral advisor: Sylvain Bromberger

Philosophical work
- Era: Contemporary philosophy
- Region: Western philosophy
- School: Analytic
- Institutions: University of Southern California
- Doctoral students: Richard Holton
- Main interests: Philosophy of language
- Notable ideas: Having a belief (the basic representational phenomenon) as explicit predication (explicitly accepting a certain predication); Criticism of semantic two-dimensionalism

Scott Soames (/soʊmz/; born 1945) is an American philosopher. He is a distinguished professor of philosophy at the University of Southern California (since 2004), and previously taught at Princeton University. He specializes in the philosophy of language and the history of analytic philosophy. He is well known for defending and expanding on the program in the philosophy of language started by Saul Kripke as well as being a major critic of two-dimensionalist theories of meaning.

== Life and career ==
Scott Soames was born in 1945. He did his undergraduate work in philosophy at Stanford University and his graduate work at the Massachusetts Institute of Technology (MIT) in linguistics and philosophy. He received his Ph.D. in philosophy from MIT in 1976.

Soames taught at Yale University from 1976 to 1980, and from 1980 to 2004 at Princeton University. His departure from Princeton in 2004 was seen as a major loss at the philosophy department there. Gilbert Harman, one of Soames's colleagues, was quoted at the time saying that "He's one of the most distinguished people we've got." Since 2004 he has been a professor at the University of Southern California, Department of Philosophy. He was elected a Fellow of the American Academy of Arts and Sciences in 2010.

Soames added his name to a list of public supporters of Donald Trump in 2016.

== Philosophical work ==
Soames specializes in the philosophy of language and the history of analytic philosophy. He has published books and articles primarily on issues concerning truth, reference, and meaning. Fairly early in his career, he and Nathan Salmon edited a book entitled Propositions and Attitudes (1989), a collection of readings that investigates philosophical issues surrounding the nature of propositions. Later in his career, Soames became known for expanding on the anti-descriptivist philosophy of language developed by Saul Kripke in Naming and Necessity (1972/1980)—see Soames's Beyond Rigidity: The Unfinished Semantic Agenda of 'Naming and Necessity' (2002). He is also a major critic of two-dimensionalist theories of semantics—see his Reference and Description: The Case against Two-Dimensionalism (2005).

Philosophical Analysis in the Twentieth Century (2003), his two-volume history of analytic philosophy developed from a lecture course regularly given at Princeton, has been the subject of significant controversy among historians of analytic philosophy, with exchanges, often heated, in the Notre Dame Philosophical Review, Brian Weatherson's blog, the journal The Philosophical Quarterly, and Soames's own web page.

== Selected publications ==
The following are partial lists of publications by Scott Soames:

=== Books ===
- (1989) Propositions and Attitudes, edited with Nathan Salmon (Oxford University Press).
- (1999) Understanding Truth (Oxford University Press). (Online.)
- (2002) Beyond Rigidity: The Unfinished Semantic Agenda of 'Naming and Necessity' (Oxford University Press).
- (2003) Philosophical Analysis in the Twentieth Century, Volumes 1: The Dawn of Analysis and Volume 2: The Age of Meaning (Princeton University Press). (Online version: Vol. 1 and Vol. 2.)
- (2005) Reference and Description: The Case against Two-Dimensionalism (Princeton University Press).
- (2010) Philosophy of Language (Princeton University Press)
- (2010) What is Meaning? (Princeton University Press)
- (2015) Rethinking Language, Mind and Meaning (Princeton University Press)
- (2019) The World Philosophy Made: From Plato to the Digital Age (Princeton University Press)

=== Articles ===
- (1973) "Tacit Knowledge", The Journal of Philosophy, Vol. 70, No. 11., pp. 318–330 (with Christina Graves, Jerrold J. Katz, Yuji Nishiyama, Robert Stecker, and Peter Tovey).
- (1983) "Generality, Truth Functions, and Expressive Capacity in the Tractatus", The Philosophical Review, Vol. 92, No. 4., pp. 573–589.
- (1984) "What is a Theory of Truth?", The Journal of Philosophy, Vol. 81, No. 8., pp. 411–429.
- (1989) "Semantics and Semantic Competence", Philosophical Perspectives, Vol. 3, pp. 575–596.
- (1994) "Attitudes and Anaphora", Philosophical Perspectives, Vol. 8, pp. 251–272.
- (1997) "The Truth about Deflationism", Philosophical Issues, Vol. 8, pp. 1–44.
- (1998) "The Modal Argument: Wide Scope and Rigidified Descriptions", Noûs, Vol. 32, No. 1., pp. 1–22.
- (1998) "Facts, Truth Conditions, and the Skeptical Solution to the Rule-Following Paradox", Noûs, Vol. 32, pp. 313–348.
- (1999) "The Indeterminacy of Translation and the Inscrutability of Reference", Canadian Journal of Philosophy, Vol. 29, No. 3, pp. 321–370.

== See also ==
- American philosophy
- List of American philosophers
