= Brian Weatherson =

Australian philosopher

Brian Weatherson is the Marshall Weinberg Professor of Philosophy at the University of Michigan. He specializes in epistemology and philosophy of language.

== Education and career ==
Born in Australia, Weatherson received his PhD from Monash University in 1998, with a dissertation on formal models for reasoning under uncertainty, titled "On Uncertainty."

Prior to joining the Michigan department in 2012, he was an associate professor at Cornell University (2008–2011) and Rutgers University (2011–2012), and also taught at Brown University (2004–2007) and Syracuse University (1999–2001).

He runs a philosophy-themed blog, "Thoughts, Arguments, and Rants" and is a contributing member of the political blog Crooked Timber.

== See also ==
- American philosophy
- List of American philosophers
