= Sense and reference =

Distinction in the philosophy of language

Die Gleichheit fordert das Nachdenken heraus durch Fragen, die sich daran knüpfen und nicht ganz leicht zu beantworten sind. Equality gives rise to challenging questions, which are not altogether easy to answer.

In the philosophy of language, the distinction between sense and reference was an idea of the German philosopher and mathematician Gottlob Frege in 1892 (in his paper "On Sense and Reference"; German: "Über Sinn und Bedeutung"), reflecting the two ways he believed a singular term may have meaning.

The reference (or "referent"; Bedeutung) of a proper name is the object it means or indicates (bedeuten), whereas its sense (Sinn) is what the name expresses. The reference of a sentence is its extension, whereas its sense is the thought that it expresses. The concept of sense can also be thought of as the "mode of presentation" of the referent, or as "indirect reference". Frege justified the distinction in a number of ways.

1. Sense is something possessed by a name, whether or not it has a reference. For example, the description "the largest integer" is intelligible, and therefore has a sense, even though there is no individual object (its reference) to which the name corresponds.
2. The sense of different names is different, even when their reference is the same. Frege argued that if an identity statement such as "Hesperus is the same planet as Phosphorus" is to be informative, the proper names flanking the identity sign must have a different meaning or sense. But clearly, if the statement is true, they must have the same reference. The sense is a 'mode of presentation', which serves to illuminate only a single aspect of the referent.

Much of analytic philosophy is traceable to Frege's philosophy of language. Frege's views on logic and the philosophy of mathematics (i.e., his idea that some parts of speech are complete by themselves, and are analogous to the arguments of a mathematical function) led to his views on a theory of reference.

== Background ==
Frege developed his original theory of meaning in early works like Begriffsschrift (concept paper) of 1879 and Grundlagen (Foundations of Arithmetic) of 1884. This theory was inspired by a logicist approach to developing mathematics, especially relating to the issue of formalizing mathematical proofs. His project also came from the rejection of the common Kantian view that mathematics is synthetic a priori. On this theory, the meaning of a complete sentence consists in its being true or false, and the meaning of each significant expression in the sentence is an extralinguistic entity which Frege called its Bedeutung, literally meaning or significance, but rendered by Frege's translators as reference, referent, 'Meaning', nominatum, etc. Frege supposed that some parts of speech are complete by themselves, and are analogous to the arguments of a mathematical function, but that other parts are incomplete, and contain an empty place, by analogy with the function itself. Thus "Caesar conquered Gaul" divides into the complete term "Caesar", whose reference is Caesar himself, and the incomplete term "—conquered Gaul", whose reference is a concept. Only when the empty place is filled by a proper name does the reference of the completed sentence – its truth value – appear. This early theory of meaning explains how the significance or reference of a sentence (its truth value) depends on the significance or reference of its parts.

== Sense ==
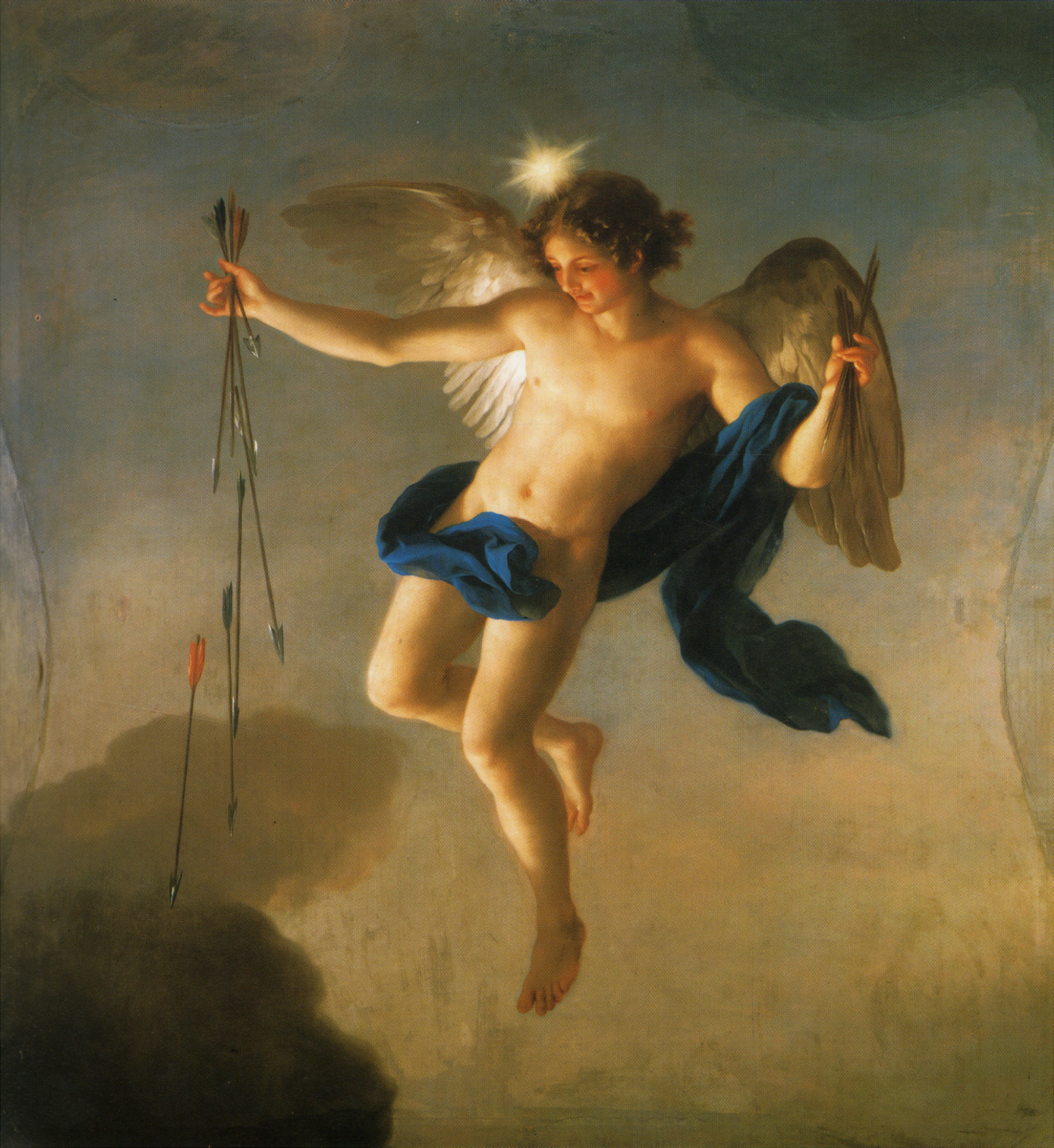
Hesperus

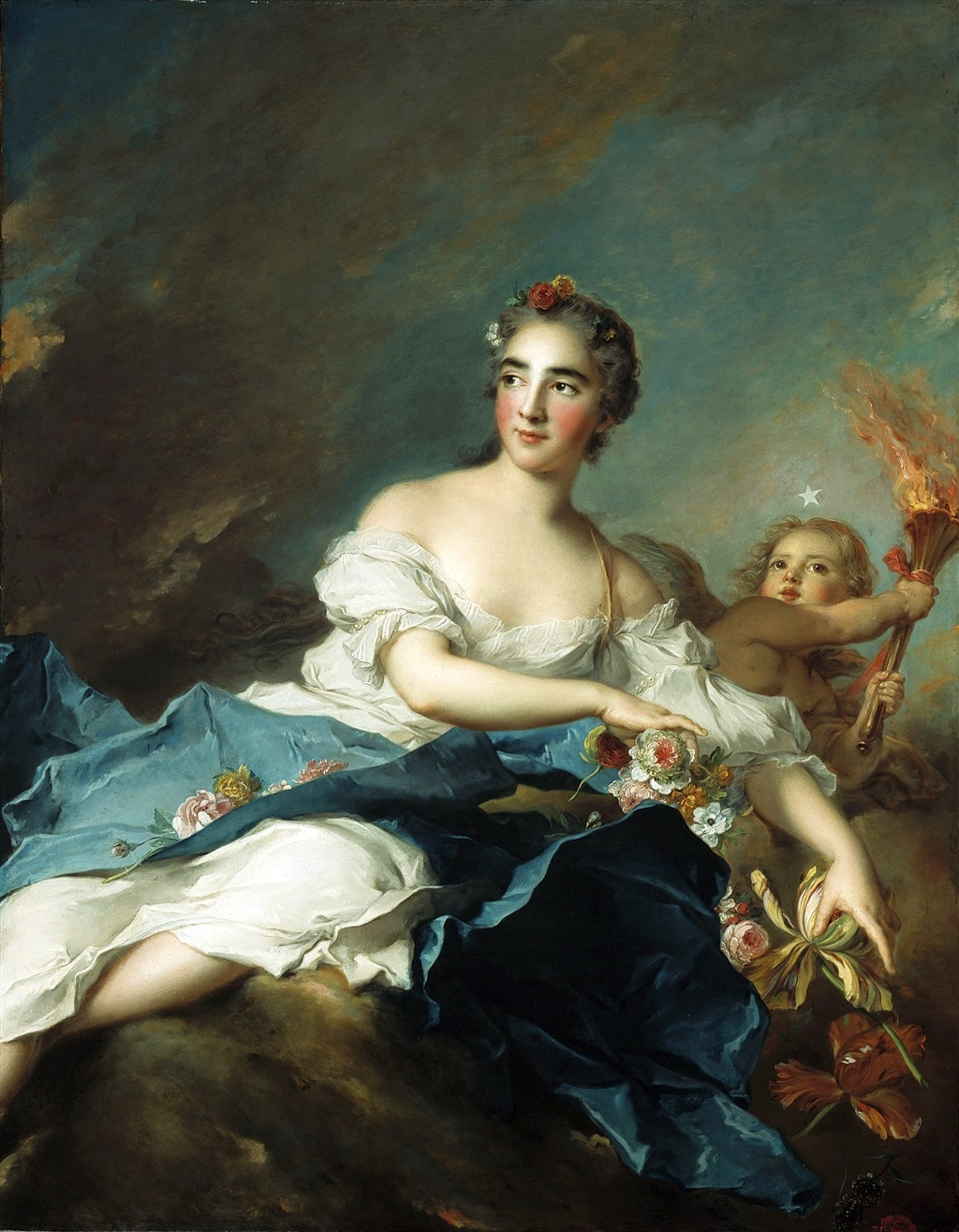
Phosphorus

Frege introduced the notion of "sense" (German: Sinn) to accommodate difficulties in his early theory of meaning.

First, if the entire significance of a sentence consists of its truth value, it follows that the sentence will have the same significance if we replace a word of the sentence with one having an identical reference, as this will not change its truth value. The reference of the whole is determined by the reference of the parts. If the evening star has the same reference as the morning star, it follows that the evening star is a body illuminated by the Sun has the same truth value as the morning star is a body illuminated by the Sun. But it is possible for someone to think that the first sentence is true while also thinking that the second is false. Therefore, the thought corresponding to each sentence cannot be its reference, but something else, which Frege called its sense.

Second, sentences that contain proper names with no reference cannot have a truth value at all. Yet the sentence 'Odysseus was set ashore at Ithaca while sound asleep' obviously has a sense, even though 'Odysseus' has no reference. The thought remains the same whether or not 'Odysseus' has a reference. Furthermore, a thought cannot contain the objects that it is about. For example, Mont Blanc, 'with its snowfields', cannot be a component of the thought that Mont Blanc is more than 4,000 metres high. Nor can a thought about Etna contain lumps of solidified lava.

Frege's notion of sense is somewhat obscure, and neo-Fregeans have come up with different candidates for its role. Accounts based on the work of Carnap and Church treat sense as an intension, or a function from possible worlds to extensions. For example, the intension of ‘number of planets’ is a function that maps any possible world to the number of planets in that world. John McDowell supplies cognitive and reference-determining roles. Michael Devitt treats senses as causal-historical chains connecting names to referents, allowing that repeated "groundings" in an object account for reference change.

== Sense and description ==
In his theory of descriptions, Bertrand Russell held the view that most proper names in ordinary language are in fact disguised definite descriptions. For example, 'Aristotle' can be understood as "The pupil of Plato and teacher of Alexander", or by some other uniquely applying description. This is known as the descriptivist theory of names. Because Frege used definite descriptions in many of his examples, he is often taken to have endorsed the descriptivist theory. Thus Russell's theory of descriptions was conflated with Frege's theory of sense, and for most of the twentieth century this "Frege–Russell" view was the orthodox view of proper name semantics. Saul Kripke argued influentially against the descriptivist theory, asserting that proper names are rigid designators which designate the same object in every possible world. Descriptions, however, such as "the President of the U.S. in 1969" do not designate the same entity in every possible world. For example, someone other than Richard Nixon, e.g. Hubert H. Humphrey, might have been the President in 1969. Hence a description (or cluster of descriptions) cannot be a rigid designator, and thus a proper name cannot mean the same as a description.

However, the Russellian descriptivist reading of Frege has been rejected by many scholars, in particular by Gareth Evans in The Varieties of Reference and by John McDowell in "The Sense and Reference of a Proper Name", following Michael Dummett, who argued that Frege's notion of sense should not be equated with a description. Evans further developed this line, arguing that a sense without a referent was not possible. He and McDowell both take the line that Frege's discussion of empty names, and of the idea of sense without reference, are inconsistent, and that his apparent endorsement of descriptivism rests only on a small number of imprecise and perhaps offhand remarks. And both point to the power that the sense-reference distinction does have (i.e., to solve at least the first two problems), even if it is not given a descriptivist reading.

== Sense and tone ==
Frege also made a distinction between the notion of sense, and the notion of Färbung or Duft, the former of which loosely translates to coloring, while the latter translates to scent. A common English name for this concept is tone. "Tone", as used by Frege, refers to characteristics of sentences which may have a different connotation compared to other sentences, but have the same truth value.

== Translation of Bedeutung ==
Translators of Frege have rendered the German Bedeutung in various ways. The term 'reference' has been the most widely adopted, but this fails to capture the meaning of the original German ('meaning' or 'significance'), and does not reflect the decision to standardise key terms across different editions of Frege's works published by Blackwell. The decision was based on the principle of exegetical neutrality: that "if at any point in a text there is a passage that raises for the native speaker legitimate questions of exegesis, then, if at all possible, a translator should strive to confront the reader of his version with the same questions of exegesis and not produce a version which in his mind resolves those questions". The term 'meaning' best captures the standard German meaning of Bedeutung.

However, while Frege's own use of the term can sound as odd in German for modern readers as when translated into English, the related term deuten does mean 'to point towards'. Though Bedeutung is not usually used with this etymological proximity in mind in German, German speakers can well make sense of Bedeutung as signifying 'reference', in the sense of it being what Bedeutung points, i.e. refers to. Moreover, 'meaning' captures Frege's early use of Bedeutung well, and it would be problematic to translate Frege's early use as 'meaning' and his later use as 'reference', suggesting a change in terminology not evident in the original German.

== Precursors ==
=== Antisthenes ===
The Greek philosopher Antisthenes, a pupil of Socrates, apparently distinguished "a general object that can be aligned with the meaning of the utterance” from “a particular object of extensional reference". According to Susan Prince, this "suggests that he makes a distinction between sense and reference". The principal basis of Prince's claim is a passage in Alexander of Aphrodisias' “Comments on Aristotle's 'Topics'” with a three-way distinction:

1. the semantic medium, δι' ὧν λέγουσι
2. an object external to the semantic medium, περὶ οὗ λέγουσιν
3. the direct indication of a thing, σημαίνειν ... τὸ ...

=== Stoicism ===
The Stoic doctrine of lekta refers to a correspondence between speech and the object referred to in speech, as distinct from the speech itself. British classicist R. W. Sharples cites lekta as an anticipation of the distinction between sense and reference.

=== John Stuart Mill ===
The sense-reference distinction is commonly confused with that between connotation and denotation, which originates with John Stuart Mill. According to Mill, a common term like 'white' denotes all white things, as snow, paper. But according to Frege, a common term does not refer to any individual white thing, but rather to an abstract concept (Begriff). We must distinguish between the relation of reference, which holds between a proper name and the object it refers to, such as between the name 'Earth' and the planet Earth, and the relation of 'falling under', such as when the Earth falls under the concept planet. The relation of a proper name to the object it designates is direct, whereas a word like 'planet' does not have such a direct relation to the Earth; instead, it refers to a concept under which the Earth falls. Moreover, judging of anything that it falls under this concept is not in any way part of our knowledge of what the word 'planet' means. The distinction between connotation and denotation is closer to that between concept and object than to that between 'sense' and 'reference'.

== See also ==
- Descriptivist theory of names
- Definite description
- Direct and indirect realism
- Frege's puzzles
- Intensional logic
- Mediated reference theory
- Temperature paradox
- Theories of language
- Use–mention distinction
- Concept horse paradox
