= Keith Donnellan =

American philosopher

- Born: Keith Sedgwick Donnellan; June 25, 1931; Washington, D.C., U.S.
- Died: February 20, 2015 (aged 83); Fairfax, California, U.S.

Academic background
- Education: Cornell University
- Thesis: C. I. Lewis and the Foundations of Necessary Truth (1961)
- Doctoral advisor: Max Black

Academic work
- Era: Contemporary philosophy
- Region: Western philosophy
- School or tradition: Analytic philosophy
- Institutions: UCLA
- Doctoral students: John Perry
- Main interests: Philosophy of language
- Notable works: "Reference and Definite Descriptions", "Proper Names and Identifying Descriptions", "Speaking of Nothing"
- Notable ideas: Causal-historical theory of reference The distinction between "referential" and "attributive use"

Keith Sedgwick Donnellan (/ˈdɒnələn/; June 25, 1931 – February 20, 2015) was an American philosopher and professor of philosophy (later professor emeritus) at the University of California, Los Angeles.

Donnellan contributed to the philosophy of language, notably to the analysis of proper names and definite descriptions. He criticized Bertrand Russell's theory of definite descriptions for overlooking the distinction between referential and attributive use of definite descriptions.

Donnellan spent most of his career at UCLA, having also previously taught at the university where he had earned his PhD, Cornell University.

== Philosophical work ==
=== Proper names ===
By 1970, analytic philosophers widely accepted a view regarding the reference-relation that holds of proper names and that which they name, known as descriptivism and attributed to Bertrand Russell. Descriptivism holds that ordinary proper names (e.g., 'Socrates', 'Richard Feynman', and 'Madagascar') may be paraphrased by definite descriptions (e.g., 'Plato's favorite philosopher', 'the man who devised the theory of quantum electrodynamics', and 'the largest island off the southeastern coast of Africa'). Saul Kripke gave a series of three lectures at Princeton University in 1970, later published as Naming and Necessity, in which he argued against descriptivism and sketched the causal-historical theory of reference according to which each proper name necessarily designates a particular object and that the identity of the object so designated is determined by the history of the name's use. These lectures were highly influential and marked the decline of descriptivism's popularity. Kripke's alternative view was, by his own account, not fully developed in his lectures. Donnellan's work on proper names is among the earliest and most influential developments of the causal-historical theory of reference.

=== Descriptions ===
"Reference and Definite Descriptions" has been one of Donnellan's most influential essays. Written in response to the work of Bertrand Russell and P. F. Strawson in the area of definite descriptions, the essay develops a distinction between the "referential use" and the "attributive use" of a definite description. The attributive use most nearly reflects Russell's understanding of descriptions. When a person uses a description such as "Smith's murderer" attributively, they mean to pick out the individual that fits that description, whoever or whatever it is. The referential use, on the other hand, functions to pick out who or what a speaker is talking about, so that something can be said about that person or thing.

== Publications ==
- Donnellan, Keith S. (July 1966). "Reference and Definite Descriptions". The Philosophical Review. 75 (3). The Philosophical Review, Vol. 75, No. 3: 281–304. doi:10.2307/2183143. JSTOR 2183143.
- Donnellan, Keith S. (1972). "Proper Names and Identifying Descriptions". In Donald Davidson; Gilbert Harman (eds.). Semantics of Natural Language. Dordrecht: D. Reidel. pp. 356–379. ISBN 9789027701954.
- Donnellan, Keith S. (1974). "Speaking of Nothing". Philosophical Review. 83 (1): 3–31. doi:10.2307/2183871. JSTOR 2183871.
- Donnellan, Keith S. (1977). "The Contingent A Priori and Rigid Designators". Midwest Studies in Philosophy. 2 (2): 12–27. doi:10.1111/j.1475-4975.1977.tb00025.x.
- Donnellan, Keith S. (1978). "Speaker Reference, Descriptions, and Anaphora". In Peter Cole (ed.). Syntax and Semantics 9: Pragmatics. New York: Academic Press. pp. 47–68.
- Donnellan, Keith S. (2012). Joseph Almog, Paolo Leonardi (ed.). Essays on Reference, Language, and Mind. New York: Oxford University Press.

== See also ==
- American philosophy
- List of American philosophers
