= Michael Devitt =

Australian philosopher

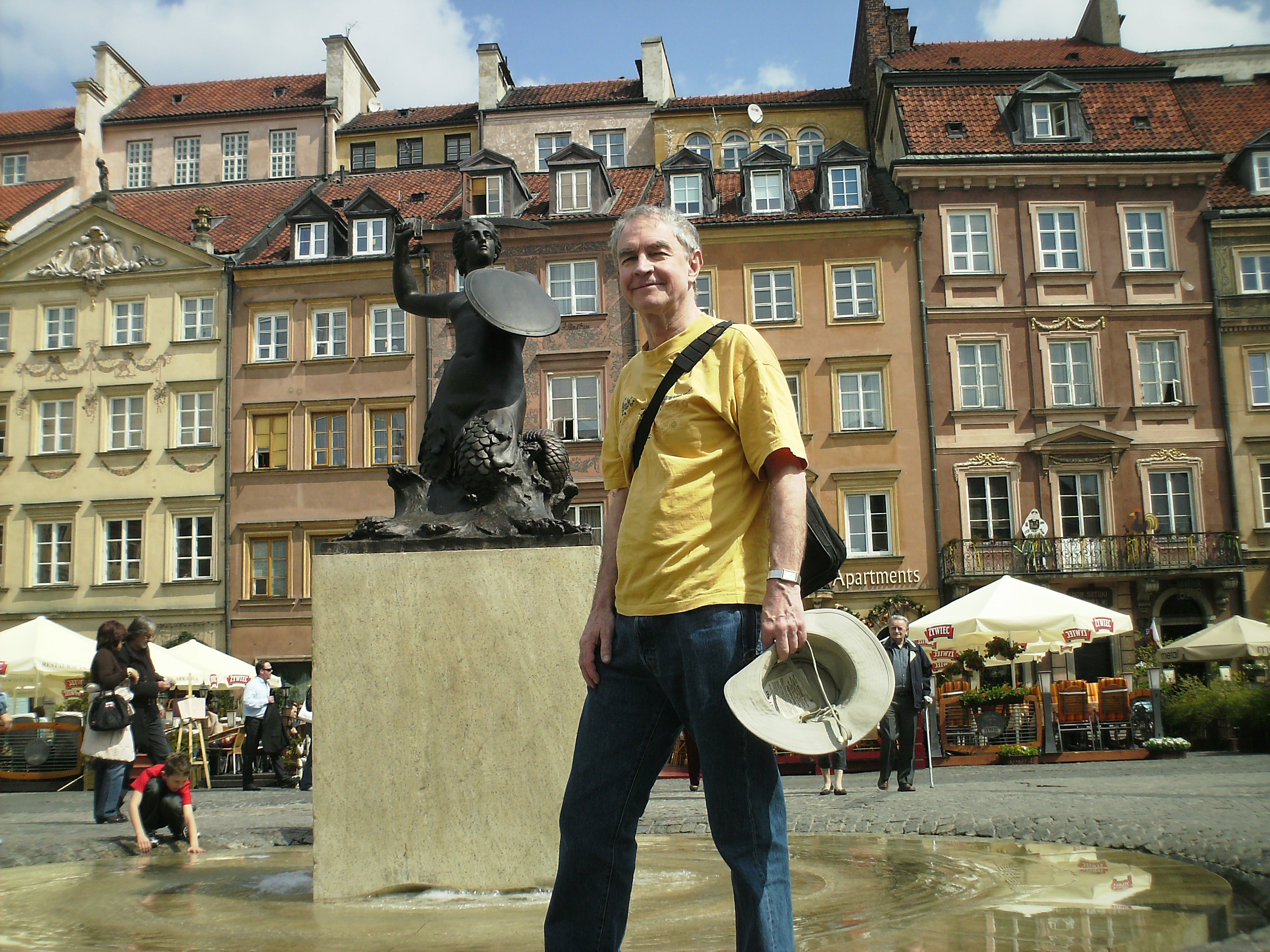
- Devitt in Warsaw, 2008
- Born: 1938 (age 87–88)

Philosophical work
- Era: Contemporary philosophy
- Region: Western philosophy
- School: Analytic philosophy Scientific realism
- Main interests: Philosophy of language, philosophy of mind, metaphysics, epistemology
- Notable ideas: Criticism of the transcendental argument against eliminativism

Michael Devitt (/ˈdɛvɪt/; born 1938) is an Australian philosopher currently teaching at the Graduate Center of the City University of New York in New York City. His primary interests include philosophy of language, philosophy of mind, metaphysics and epistemology. His current work involves the philosophy of linguistics, foundational issues in semantics, the semantics of definite descriptions and demonstratives, semantic externalism, and scientific realism.

== Education ==
Devitt's secondary education (1952–1957) was at Bradfield College in Berkshire, England, where he completed 3 "A" Levels and 9 "O" Levels. He then studied at the Institute of Chartered Accountants in Australia between 1958–1961, taking his qualifying exam at the end of that time.

His higher education began at the University of Sydney in 1962, where he studied philosophy and psychology. He graduated in 1966 with First Class Honours and a University Medal in philosophy. He continued on as a post-graduate research student until 1967, when he moved to Harvard University and studied under Quine. He received his MA in 1970 and his PhD in 1972.

== Academic positions ==
Following the completion of his coursework at Harvard, Michael Devitt returned to Sydney in 1971 and began his teaching career as a lecturer in the Philosophy department. He was prominent in the 'Sydney philosophy disturbances'. He was made a senior lecturer in 1977 and associate professor in 1982, and by 1985 was named as Head of Department of Traditional and Modern Philosophy. He continued teaching at the University of Sydney until 1987, after which he returned to the United States and accepted an appointment of Professor of Philosophy at the University of Maryland, College Park in 1988. He remained in Maryland until 1999, when he became a Professor (later Distinguished Professor) at the CUNY Graduate Center. There he served as the Executive Officer of the Philosophy Program from 1999–2002. He continues to teach there as a Distinguished Professor as of 2012.

In addition to his tenured or tenure-track positions, Michael Devitt has held numerous non-tenured positions at the University of Nottingham, Macquarie University, Australian National University, Victoria University of Wellington, University of Michigan, University of Southern California, Tokyo Metropolitan University, Harvard University, and The Women's College, University of Sydney.

Devitt was elected a Corresponding Fellow of the Australian Academy of the Humanities in 1985.

== Philosophical work ==
Devitt is a proponent of the causal theory of reference. He claims that repeated groundings in an object can account for reference change. However, such a response leaves open the problem of cognitive significance that originally intrigued Bertrand Russell and Gottlob Frege.

Devitt, along with Georges Rey, is also a critic of the transcendental argument against eliminativism, and defends this position against claims that it is self-refuting by invoking deflationary semantic theories that avoid analysing predicates like "x is true" as expressing a real property. They are construed, instead, as logical devices so that asserting that a sentence is true is just a quoted way of asserting the sentence itself. To say, "'God exists' is true" is just to say, "God exists". This way, Rey and Devitt argue, in so far as dispositional replacements of "claims" and deflationary accounts of "true" are coherent, eliminativism is not self-refuting.

== Publications ==
- Designation. New York: Columbia University Press, 1981, xiii, 311 pp.
- Realism and Truth. Oxford: Basil Blackwell, 1984, ix, 250 pp. (Princeton: Princeton University Press). 2nd edn revised, Oxford: Basil Blackwell, 1991, xii, 327pp. Reprinted "with a new afterword," Princeton: Princeton University Press, 1997, xii, 371pp.
- Language and Reality (1987 – with Kim Sterelny). MIT Press: ISBN 0-262-54099-1; ISBN 978-0-262-54099-5; ISBN 0-262-04173-1; Blackwell Publishing ISBN 0-631-19689-7; ISBN 978-0-631-19689-1.
- Coming to Our Senses: A Naturalistic Program for Semantic Localism. New York: Cambridge University Press, 1996, x, 338pp.
- "Meanings Just Ain't in the Head." Method, Reason and Language: Essays in honour of Hilary Putnam, George Boolos, ed. Cambridge: Cambridge University Press (1990), pp. 79–104. Reprinted in Cro(Pran in Filozofskim Istrazivanjima 45 (1992), pp. 425–45.
- "A Shocking Idea about Meaning." Revue Internationale de Philosophie, a special issue devoted to Hilary Putnam, in press.
- "The Metaphysics of Truth." In The Nature of Truth, Michael Lynch, ed. Cambridge, Massachusetts: MIT Press (2001).
- Putting Metaphysics First. Essays on Metaphysics and Epistemology. New York: Oxford University Press, 2010, pp. 346
