= Singular term =

Expressions denoting individual entities

Singular terms are as expressions that purport to denote or designate particular individual people, places, or other objects. They contrast with general terms (such as "car" or "chair") which can apply to more than one thing.

== Overview ==
There are various kinds of singular terms: proper names (e.g. "Matthew"), definite descriptions (e.g. "the second fisherman in the boat"), singular personal pronouns (e.g. "she"), demonstrative pronouns (e.g. "this"), etc.

Historically, various definitions for "singular term" have been offered:

1. A term that tells us which individual is being talked about. (John Stuart Mill, Arthur Prior, P. F. Strawson)
2. A term that is grammatically singular, i.e. a proper name (proprium nomen), a demonstrative pronoun (pronomen demonstrativum) or a demonstrative pronoun with a common name (cum termino communi). (William of Ockham)
3. A term that is inherently about the object to which it applies or refers. (Gottlob Frege)
4. A term that is true "in the same sense" of only one object. (Peter of Spain)

== Works cited ==
- Frege, G. (1892) "On Sense and Reference", originally published as " Über Sinn und Bedeutung" in Zeitschrift für Philosophie und philosophische Kritik, vol. 100, pp. 25–50. Transl. Geach & Black 56–78.
- Mill, J. S., A System of Logic, London 1908 (8th edition).
- Peter of Spain Summulae Logicales, ed. I. M. Bochenski (Turin, 1947) – also quoted in Prior 1976.
- Prior, A. N. The Doctrine of Propositions & Terms, London 1976.
- Strawson, P. F. "On Referring", Mind 1950 pp. 320–44.
- William of Ockham, Summa logicae, Paris 1448, Bologna 1498, Venice 1508, Oxford 1675.
