= Descriptivist theory of names =

Theory in philosophy of language

In the philosophy of language, the descriptivist theory of proper names (also descriptivist theory of reference) is the view that the meaning or semantic content of a proper name is identical to the descriptions associated with it by speakers, while their referents are determined to be the objects that satisfy these descriptions. Bertrand Russell and Gottlob Frege have both been associated with the descriptivist theory, which has been called the mediated reference theory or Frege–Russell view.

In the 1970s, this theory came under attack from causal theorists such as Saul Kripke, Hilary Putnam and others. However, it has seen something of a revival in recent years, especially under the form of what are called two-dimensional semantic theories. This latter trend is exemplified by the theories of David Chalmers, among others.

== The descriptive theory and its merits ==
A simple descriptivist theory of names can be thought of as follows: for every proper name p, there is some collection of descriptions D associated with p that constitute the meaning of p. For example, the descriptivist may hold that the proper name Saul Kripke is synonymous with the collection of descriptions such as

1. the man who wrote Naming and Necessity
2. a person who was born on November 13, 1940, in Bay Shore, New York
3. the son of a leader of Beth El Synagogue in Omaha, Nebraska

etc ...

The descriptivist takes the meaning of the name Saul Kripke to be that collection of descriptions and takes the referent of the name to be the thing that satisfies all or most of those descriptions.

A simple descriptivist theory may further hold that the meaning of a sentence S that contains p is given by the collection of sentences produced by replacing each instance of p in S with one of the descriptions in D. So, the sentence such as "Saul Kripke stands next to a table" has the same meaning as the following collection of sentences:

1. The man who wrote Naming and Necessity stands next to a table.
2. A person who was born on November 13, 1940, in Bay Shore, New York, stands next to a table.
3. The son of a leader of Beth El Synagogue in Omaha, Nebraska, stands next to a table.

etc ...

A version of descriptivism was formulated by Frege in reaction to problems with his original theory of meaning or reference (Bedeutung), which entailed that sentences with empty proper names cannot have a meaning. Yet a sentence containing the name 'Odysseus' is intelligible, and therefore has a sense, even though there is no individual object (its reference) to which the name corresponds. Also, the sense of different names is different, even when their reference is the same. Frege said that if an identity statement such as "Hesperus is the same planet as Phosphorus" is to be informative, the proper names flanking the identity sign must have a different meaning or sense. But clearly, if the statement is true, they must have the same reference. The sense is a 'mode of presentation', which serves to illuminate only a single aspect of the referent. Scholars disagree as to whether Frege intended such modes of presentation to be descriptions. See the article Sense and reference.

Russell's approach is somewhat different. First of all, Russell makes an important distinction between what he calls "ordinary" proper names and "logically" proper names. Logically proper names are indexicals such as this and that, which directly refer (in a Millian sense) to sense-data or other objects of immediate acquaintance. For Russell, ordinary proper names are abbreviated definite descriptions. Here definite description refers again to the type of formulation "The…" which was used above to describe Santa Claus as "the benevolent, bearded…." According to Russell, the name "Aristotle" is just a sort of shorthand for a definite description such as "The last great philosopher of ancient Greece" or "The teacher of Alexander the great" or some conjunction of two or more such descriptions. Now, according to Russell's theory of definite descriptions, such descriptions must, in turn, be reduced, to a certain very specific logical form of existential generalization as follows:

- "The king of France is bald."

becomes

- $\exists x (K(x) \land \forall y (K(y) \rightarrow x=y) \land B(x))$

This says that there is exactly one object ‘’x’’ such that ‘’x’’ is King of France and ‘’x’’ is bald. Notice that this formulation is entirely general: it says that there is some x out in the world that satisfies the description, but does not specify which one thing ‘’x’’ refers to. Indeed, for Russell, definite descriptions (and hence names) have no reference at all and their meanings (senses in the Fregean sense) are just the truth conditions of the logical forms illustrated above. This is made clearer by Russell’s example involving ‘’Bismarck’’:

- (G) "The Chancellor of Germany..."

In this case, Russell suggests that only Bismarck himself can be in a relation of acquaintance such that the man himself enters into the proposition expressed by the sentence. For any other than Bismarck, the only relation that is possible with such a proposition is through its descriptions. Bismarck could never have existed and the sentence (G) would still be meaningful because of its general nature described by the logical form underlying the sentence.

Notwithstanding these differences however, descriptivism and the descriptive theory of proper names came to be associated with both the views of Frege and Russell and both address the general problems (names without bearers, Frege's puzzles concerning identity and substitution in contexts of intentional attitude attributions) in a similar manner.

Another problem for Millianism is Frege's famous puzzles concerning the identity of co-referring terms. For example:

- (V) "Hesperus is Phosphorus."

In this case, both terms ("Hesperus" and "Phosphorus") refer to the same entity: Venus. The Millian theory would predict that this sentence is trivial, since meaning is just reference and "Venus is Venus" is not very informative. Suppose, however, that someone did not know that Hesperus and Phosphorus both referred to Venus. Then it is at least arguable that the sentence (V) is an attempt to inform someone of just this fact.

Another problem for Millianism is that of statements such as ”Fred believes that Cicero, but not Tully, was Roman.”

== Kripke’s objections and the causal theory ==
In his book Naming and Necessity, Saul Kripke criticised the descriptivist theory. At the end of Lecture I (pp. 64–70) Kripke sets out what he believes to be the tenets of the descriptivist theory. Kripke formally states a number of theses as the core of the descriptivist theory, with these theses explaining the theory in terms of reference (rather than the sense or meaning). As he explains before stating the theory, "There are more theses if you take it in the stronger version as a theory of meaning" (p. 64).

As he states it, the descriptivist theory is "weaker," i.e., the claims it makes do not assert as much as a stronger theory would. This actually makes it harder to refute. The descriptivist theory of meaning would include these theses and definitions however, thus refuting these would suffice for refuting the descriptivist theory of meaning as well. Kripke formulates them as follows:

1. To every name or designating expression 'X', there corresponds a cluster of properties, namely the family of those properties φ such that [speaker] A believes 'φX'
2. One of the properties, or some conjointly, are believed by A to pick out some individual uniquely.
3. If most, or a weighted most, of the φ's are satisfied by one unique object y, then y is the referent of 'X'.
4. If the vote yields no unique object, 'X' does not refer.
5. The statement, 'If X exists, then X has most of the φ's [corresponding to X]' is known a priori by the speaker.
6. The statement, 'If X exists, then X has most of the φ's [corresponding to X]' expresses a necessary truth (in the idiolect of the speaker).

(1) States the properties or concepts related to any given proper name, where a name 'X' has a set of properties associated with it. The set of properties are those that a speaker, on inquiry of "Who is Barack Obama?" would respond "The former President of the U.S., former Senator of Illinois, husband of Michelle Obama, etc." (1) does not stipulate that the set of properties φ is the meaning of X. (2) stipulates the epistemic position of the speaker. Note (2) says "believed by A to pick out."

(3) Takes the properties in (1) and (2) and turns them into a mechanism of reference. Basically, if a unique object satisfies the properties associated with 'X' such that A believes that 'X has such-and-such properties', it picks out or refers to that object. (4) states what happens when no object satisfies the properties (Kripke talks in terms of taking a "vote" as to the unique referent).

(5) Follows from (1)–(3). If there is a set of properties that speaker A believes to be associated with X, then these properties must be already known by the speaker. In this sense they are a priori. To know what a bachelor is, an individual must know what an unmarried male is; likewise an individual must know who is 'The President of the U.S., former Senator of Illinois, husband of Michelle Obama, etc.' to know who Obama is. (6) However is not a direct product of the theses. Kripke notes "(6) need not be a thesis of the theory if someone doesn't think that the cluster is part of the meaning of the name" (p. 65). However, when the descriptivist theory is taken as a theory of reference and meaning, (6) would be a thesis.

Taken as a theory of reference, the following would be true:

- If someone fits the description 'the author who wrote, among other things, 1984 and Animal Farm' uniquely, then this someone is the George Orwell. (Thesis 3)
- 'George Orwell wrote, among other things, 1984 and Animal Farm' is known a priori by the speaker. (Thesis 5)

The idea in the second sentence is that one can't refer to something without knowing what he or she is referring to. Taken as a theory of reference and meaning, the following would be true:

- The author who wrote, among other things, 1984 and Animal Farm, wrote 1984 and Animal Farm. (Thesis 6)

After breaking down the descriptivist theory, he begins to point out what's wrong with it. First, he offered up what has come to be known as "the modal argument" (or "argument from rigidity") against descriptivism. Consider the name "Aristotle" and the descriptions "the greatest student of Plato," "the founder of logic" and "the teacher of Alexander." Aristotle obviously satisfies all of the descriptions (and many of the others we commonly associate with him), but it is not a necessary truth that if Aristotle existed then Aristotle was any one, or all, of these descriptions, contrary to thesis (6). Aristotle might well have existed without doing any single one of the things he is known for. He might have existed and not have become known to posterity at all or he might have died in infancy.

Suppose that Aristotle is associated by Mary with the description “the last great philosopher of antiquity” and (the actual) Aristotle died in infancy. Then Mary's description would seem to refer to Plato. But this is deeply counterintuitive. Hence, names are "rigid designators," according to Kripke. That is, they refer to the same individual in every possible world in which that individual exists.

This is the counterintuitive result of thesis (6). For descriptivists Aristotle means "the greatest student of Plato," "the founder of logic" and "the teacher of Alexander." So the sentence “the greatest student of Plato, etc., was the greatest student of Plato,” is equivalent to "Aristotle was the greatest student of Plato, etc." Of course a sentence like “x=x” is necessary, but this just isn't the case with proper names and their descriptions. Aristotle could have done something else, thus he is not necessarily identical to his description.

The second argument employed by Kripke has come to be called the "epistemic argument" (or "argument from unwanted necessity"). This is simply the observation that if the meaning of "Angela Merkel" is "the Chancellor of Germany," then "Angela is the Chancellor of Germany" should seem to the average person to be a priori, analytic, and trivial, as if falling out of the meaning of "Angela Merkel" just as "unmarried male" falls out of the meaning of "bachelor." If thesis (5) is to hold, the properties of Angela Merkel should be known a priori by the speaker. But this is not true. We had to go out into the world to see who the Chancellor of Germany is.

Kripke's third argument against descriptive theories consisted in pointing out that people may associate inadequate or inaccurate descriptions with proper names. Kripke uses Kurt Gödel as an example. The only thing most people know about Gödel is that he proved the incompleteness of arithmetic. Suppose he hadn't proved it, and really he stole it from his friend Schmidt. Thesis (3) says that if most of the properties associated with 'Gödel' are satisfied by one unique object, in this case Schmidt, then Schmidt is the referent of 'Gödel.' This means that every time someone (in the world where Gödel stole the incompleteness theorem from Schmidt) says 'Gödel' he or she is actually referring to Schmidt. This is far too counter-intuitive for the descriptivist theory to hold.

== Revival of descriptivism and two-dimensionalism ==
In recent years, there has been something of a revival in descriptivist theories, including descriptivist theories of proper names. Metalinguistic description theories have been developed and adopted by such contemporary theorists as Kent Bach and Jerrold Katz. According to Katz, "metalinguistic description theories explicate the sense of proper nouns--but not common nouns--in terms of a relation between the noun and the objects that bear its name." Differently from the traditional theory, such theories do not posit a need for sense to determine reference and the metalinguistic description mentions the name it is the sense of (hence it is "metalinguistic") while placing no conditions on being the bearer of a name. Katz's theory, to take this example, is based on the fundamental idea that sense should not have to be defined in terms of, nor determine, referential or extensional properties but that it should be defined in terms of, and determined by, all and only the intensional properties of names.

He illustrates the way a metalinguistic description theory can be successful against Kripkean counterexamples by citing, as one example, the case of "Jonah." Kripke’s Jonah case is very powerful because in this case the only information that we have about the Biblical character Jonah is just what the Bible tells us. Unless we are fundamentalist literalists, it is not controversial that all of this is false. Since, under traditional descriptivism, these descriptions are what define the name Jonah, these descriptivists must say that Jonah did not exist. But this does not follow. But under Katz's version of descriptivism, the sense of Jonah contains no information derived from the Biblical accounts but contains only the term "Jonah" itself in the phrase "the thing that is a bearer of 'Jonah'." Hence, it is not vulnerable to these kinds of counterexamples.

The most common and challenging criticism to metalinguistic description theories was put forth by Kripke himself: they seem to be an ad hoc explanation of a single linguistic phenomenon. Why should there be a metalinguistic theory for proper nouns (like names) but not for common nouns, count nouns, verbs, predicates, indexicals and other parts of speech?

Another recent approach is two-dimensional semantics. The motivations for this approach are rather different from those that inspired other forms of descriptivism, however. Two-dimensional approaches are usually motivated by a sense of dissatisfaction with the causal theorist explanation of how it is that a single proposition can be both necessary and a posteriori or contingent and a priori.

== See also ==
- Onomastics
- Causal theory of reference
- Tag theory of names
- Theory of descriptions
