= Situation theory =

Mathematical theory of information underlying situation semantics

Situation theory is a mathematical and logical framework for modelling information, partial states of affairs and their structure. It was introduced in the early 1980s as the formal background for situation semantics developed by Jon Barwise and John Perry, and has since been elaborated by authors such as Keith Devlin, Jeremy Seligman and Lawrence S. Moss into a general theory of information and information flow. In many presentations the mathematical foundations make essential use of non-well-founded set theory, especially Peter Aczel's anti-foundation axiom, in order to model self-referential and other "circular" informational structures.

The relation between situation theory and situation semantics is often compared to that between type theory and Montague semantics: situation theory provides a general mathematical ontology (infons, situations, types, constraints), while situation semantics applies that ontology to natural-language meaning and context dependence.

== History ==
Situation theory originated as an effort to provide rigorous mathematical foundations for Barwise and Perry's situation semantics, a research programme that analyzes meaning and information in terms of partial situations rather than complete possible worlds. Early work by Barwise and his collaborators outlined the theory in papers such as "Situations and small worlds" and in the essays collected in The Situation in Logic.

During the late 1980s and early 1990s, Devlin, Seligman, Moss and others developed a more systematic version of the theory. Devlin's monograph Logic and Information (1991) presents situation theory as a general logical framework for information, introducing the central notions of infons, situations, types, parameters and constraints. The multi-volume series Situation Theory and Its Applications, edited by Robin Cooper and others, brought together papers on the logical, mathematical and linguistic dimensions of the framework.

Foundational issues, especially the treatment of self-reference and "hyper-infons" (self-referential items of information), led to reformulations based on Aczel's anti-foundation axiom (AFA). This approach permits non-well-founded sets and supports models of circular information structures that cannot be accommodated within standard well-founded set theory. Later work by Barwise and Seligman on channel theory and information flow extended situation-theoretic ideas to distributed systems and classification structures.

Edward N. Zalta's "Twenty-Five Basic Theorems in Situation and World Theory" shows how situation theory can be integrated with a theory of possible worlds by treating worlds as maximal situations and by providing a unified axiomatic treatment of both.

== Ontology and basic objects ==
Situation theory assumes a rich ontology of entities used to model information and context. Typical presentations distinguish at least the following kinds of objects:

- Individuals (objects, agents, etc.).
- Spatial and temporal locations (places and times).
- Relations of various arities.
- Situations, understood as partial, structured regions of reality (or of a model of reality).
- Infons, which are basic items or "chunks" of information.
- Types, which classify individuals, situations and other entities.
- Parameters, which act as variables or placeholders within infons and types.
- Polarities, indicating positive or negative information (often coded as 1 and 0).

Some expositions also include argument roles, propositions and a distinguished "supports" relation as additional basic categories.

=== Basic types ===
A standard formulation introduces an initial collection of basic types; more complex types are constructed from these via type abstraction (see below). One common list of basic types is:

- TIM: the type of a temporal location.
- LOC: the type of a spatial location.
- IND: the type of an individual.
- RELn: the type of an n-place relation.
- SIT: the type of a situation.
- INF: the type of an infon.
- TYP: the type of a type.
- PAR: the type of a parameter.
- POL: the type of a polarity (usually 0 for negative and 1 for positive).

Different authors sometimes work with slightly richer basic ontologies—e.g. adding basic types for propositions, argument roles or the "supports" relation—but these extensions typically preserve the core list above as a central fragment.

=== Infons ===
In situation theory, an infon is a structured item of information. Intuitively, an infon specifies that a certain relation holds (or fails to hold) of given individuals, at a given location or time, with a given polarity. Formally, a basic infon is often represented as a tuple of the form

⟨R, a_{1}, ... , a_{n}, τ, i⟩,

where:

- R is an n-place relation (of type RELn),
- a_{1}, ... , a_{n} are appropriate arguments (for example, individuals of type IND or locations of type LOC),
- τ is a spatial or temporal parameter (of type LOC or TIM), and
- i ∈ {0, 1} is a polarity indicating whether the relation is taken to obtain (1) or not obtain (0).

Infons are typed objects: if l is a spatial location, then l is of type LOC, and there is an infon

«of-type, l, LOC, 1»

which records that l is (positively) of the location type. When such an infon correctly reflects the world, it is said to be a fact.

The theory also allows for compound infons built from simpler ones using operations corresponding to conjunction (∧), disjunction (∨), restricted quantification over parameters and other logical constructions. These compound infons support a kind of "infon logic", in which satisfaction is defined relative to situations rather than to complete possible worlds.

Infons may be specific, mentioning particular individuals and locations, or parametric, containing parameters that stand in for unspecified or contextually determined objects. Parametric infons play an important role in modelling generalisations and context-dependent information.

=== Situations and the support relation ===
A situation is a structured, partial region of reality (or of a modelled domain). Unlike a classical possible world, a situation need not settle every proposition: it may support some infons, fail to support others, and simply be silent on many more.

The fundamental relation between situations and infons is written

s ⊨ σ

and read "s supports σ" (or "σ holds in s"). Here s is a situation (of type SIT) and σ is an infon (of type INF). The proposition that s supports σ can itself be treated as a higher-level object in the ontology (sometimes as a "situated proposition").

Situation theory allows for both actual situations, which correspond to parts of the real world, and fallible or informational situations, which may encode incorrect or hypothetical information (for example, the information currently stored in an agent's database). This distinction is important when analysing information flow and error.

== Types, parameters and abstraction ==
=== Parameters and anchors ===
For each basic type T (other than PAR itself), situation theory typically assumes an infinite family of basic parameters T_{1}, T_{2}, ... . Parameters of type IND, LOC, TIM, SIT and so on serve as placeholders for arbitrary individuals, locations, times and situations. Parameters are written with a dot or similar diacritic (for example, ˙a, ˙l, ˙s).

An anchor for a collection of parameters is a function that assigns to each parameter an object of the appropriate type. Anchors provide the formal mechanism by which parameters are tied to concrete individuals or situations in a given context. By varying the anchor, one can interpret the same parametric infon differently in different situations, which is crucial for modelling context dependence and quantification.

=== Situation-types and object-types ===
A central feature of situation theory is its use of type abstraction to construct types from parameters, infons and situations.

- A situation-type (or situation uniformity) is constructed from a situation parameter ˙s and a compound infon σ. The notation [˙s ∣ ˙s ⊨ σ] denotes the type of all situations in which σ holds. Intuitively, this is the type of situations of a certain informational shape (for example, the type of all situations in which there is smoke present).
- An object-type is constructed from a parameter ˙x, a "grounding" situation s and a compound infon σ. The notation [˙x ∣ s ⊨ σ] denotes the type of all objects that ˙x can be anchored to in s while making σ hold. For example, by taking σ to express that ˙x is a person in the actual world, one obtains the type of all people; by taking σ to express that ˙x is seen by a particular agent in s, one obtains a type of situations that agent can see.

In this way, both familiar kinds (such as the type of persons, books or cats) and more complex situation-types (such as "situations where there is a fire") are treated uniformly as types generated from the basic ontology.

== Constraints and information flow ==
One of the characteristic ideas of situation theory is that information flow is governed by constraints between situation-types. A constraint is written

S ⇒ S′

and links a source situation-type S with a target situation-type S′. Intuitively, such a constraint says that situations of type S normally involve situations of type S′; it can represent anything from a physical law to a linguistic or social convention.

A standard example is the informal principle "smoke means fire". Let S be the type of situations in which smoke is present and S′ the type of situations in which there is a fire. The constraint

S ⇒ S′

then captures the regularity that in normal circumstances, encountering a situation of type S licenses an inference to the existence of some (perhaps the very same) situation of type S′.

Constraints operate at the level of types, but they govern inferences involving particular situations: when an agent finds itself in a situation s of type S, awareness of the constraint allows it to infer the existence of some situation s′ of type S′. This mechanism underlies later developments such as channel theory, which studies networks of classifications and channels that mediate information flow between distributed systems.

== Relation to situation semantics and world theory ==
Situation theory was developed in tandem with situation semantics. Situation semantics uses situations and infons to analyse the meaning of natural-language utterances, typically distinguishing at least an utterance situation, a resource situation (which provides background information) and a focal or described situation. Situation theory supplies the underlying ontology and logic that make such analyses precise, including the distinction between information, representations and propositions, and the treatment of context-dependent quantification and reference.

Zalta's axiomatic work on situation and world theory shows how situation theory can be connected to more traditional possible-worlds frameworks. Worlds are treated as maximal situations (roughly, situations that cannot be properly extended), and both situations and worlds are defined within a common formal system rather than taken as primitives. This yields a uniform account of states of affairs, situations and worlds and clarifies the relationship between situation-based and world-based semantic theories.

== Applications ==
Although originally motivated by problems in the semantics and pragmatics of natural language, situation theory has been applied in a variety of areas:

- In philosophical logic and the philosophy of information, it provides a formal ontology for information items and their structure, distinct from but comparable to possible-worlds frameworks.
- In linguistics and computational linguistics, it has been used to model context-dependent phenomena (such as indexicals, presuppositions and discourse structure) and to provide semantics for fragments of natural language.
- In computer science and knowledge representation, situation-theoretic ideas underlie work on channel theory, classification systems and logics of information flow in distributed systems.
- In cognitive science and human–computer interaction, situation theory has informed the design of context-aware and interactive information systems by offering a fine-grained way to represent partial, fallible information about a changing environment.

There is also a body of survey and tutorial literature aimed at making the technical developments more accessible to researchers in neighbouring fields.

== See also ==
- Situation semantics
- State of affairs (philosophy)
- Non-well-founded set theory
- Possible world
