= Clayman (surname) =

Clayman is an English surname.

== Notable people ==
- Dee L. Clayman, American scholar and professor
- Flynn Clayman, American college basketball coach
- Michelle Clayman, American businesswoman

== See also ==
- Klayman
