= Tarski's World =

Tarski's World is a computer-based introduction to first-order logic written by Jon Barwise and John Etchemendy. It is named after the mathematical logician Alfred Tarski. The package includes a book, which serves as a textbook and manual, and a computer program which together serve as an introduction to the semantics of logic through games in which simple, three-dimensional worlds are populated with various geometric figures and these are used to test the truth or falsehood of first-order logic sentences. The program is also included in Language, Proof and Logic package.

The programme was later extended into Hyperproof.

== The programme ==
- Barwise, J., & Etchemendy, J. (1993). Tarski's world. Stanford, Calif: CSLI Publ.
- Barker-Plummer, D., Barwise, J., & Etchemendy, J. (2008). Tarski's world. Stanford, Calif: CSLI Publications.
- The Openproof Project at CSLI:home page of the Tarski's World courseware package, Dave Barker-Plummer, Jon Barwise and John Etchemendy in collaboration with Albert Liu
