= Stanford University centers and institutes =

University and college laboratories

Stanford University has many centers and institutes dedicated to the study of various specific topics. These centers and institutes may be within a department, within a school but across departments, an independent laboratory, institute or center reporting directly to the dean of research and outside any school, or semi-independent of the university itself.

== Independent laboratories, institutes and centers ==
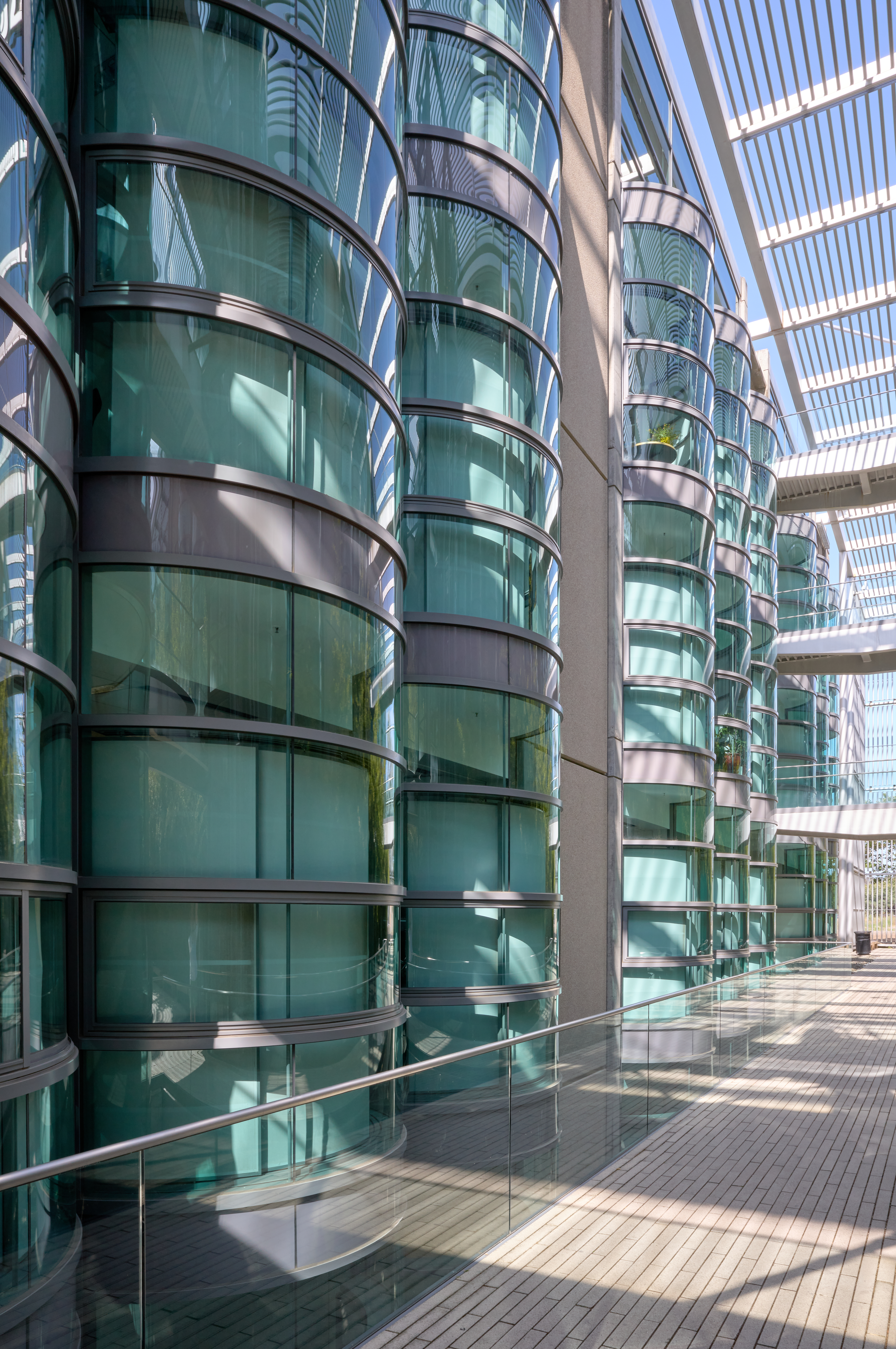
Center for Clinical Sciences Research

These report directly to the vice-provost and dean of research and are outside any school though any faculty involved in them must belong to a department in one of the schools. These include Bio-X and Spectrum in the area of Biological and Life Sciences; Precourt Institute for Energy and Woods Institute for the Environment in the Environmental Sciences area; the Center for Advanced Study in the Behavioral Sciences (CASBS), the Center for the Study of Language and Information (CSLI) (see below), Freeman Spogli Institute for International Studies (FSI) (see below), Human-Sciences and Technologies Advance Research Institute (H-STAR), Stanford Center on Longevity (SCL), Stanford Humanities Center (see below), and the Stanford Institute for Economic Policy Research (SIEPR) in the area of Humanities and Social Sciences; and, for Physical Sciences, the Edward L. Ginzton Laboratory, the Geballe Laboratory for Advanced Materials, the Kavli Institute for Particle Astrophysics and Cosmology, Photon Ultrafast Laser Science and Engineering (PULSE), Stanford Institute for Materials and Energy Sciences (SIMES), and W. W. Hansen Experimental Physics Laboratory (HEPL).

=== Center for the Study of Language and Information ===
The Center for the Study of Language and Information (CSLI) was an independent research center at Stanford University. Founded in 1983 by philosophers, computer scientists, linguists, and psychologists from Stanford, SRI International, and Xerox PARC, it aimed to study how humans and computers acquire and process information.

CSLI was initially funded by a US$15 million grant from the System Development Foundation (SDF) for the Situated Language Project, influenced of the work on situation semantics by philosophers John Perry and Jon Barwise, two of the initial leaders of CSLI. This funding supported operations for the first few years as well as the construction of Cordura Hall. Subsequent funding came from research grants and from an industrial affiliates program.1

CSLI housed the Stanford Encyclopedia of Philosophy and the Reuters Digital Vision Program.

It ceased operations in 2025.

=== Stanford Center for Biomedical Ethics ===
This center focuses on the ethical issues in medical surroundings. It was established in 1989, to facilitate interdisciplinary interactions between faculty involved in bioethics and medical humanities. The center states that it was designated by NIH as a Center for Excellence in Ethical, Legal and Social Issues (ELSI) in Genetics. Every year, the center invites an academic speaker to deliver the Jonathan King Lecture on Bioethic, in memory of computer scientist Jonathan King.

=== Freeman Spogli Institute for International Studies ===
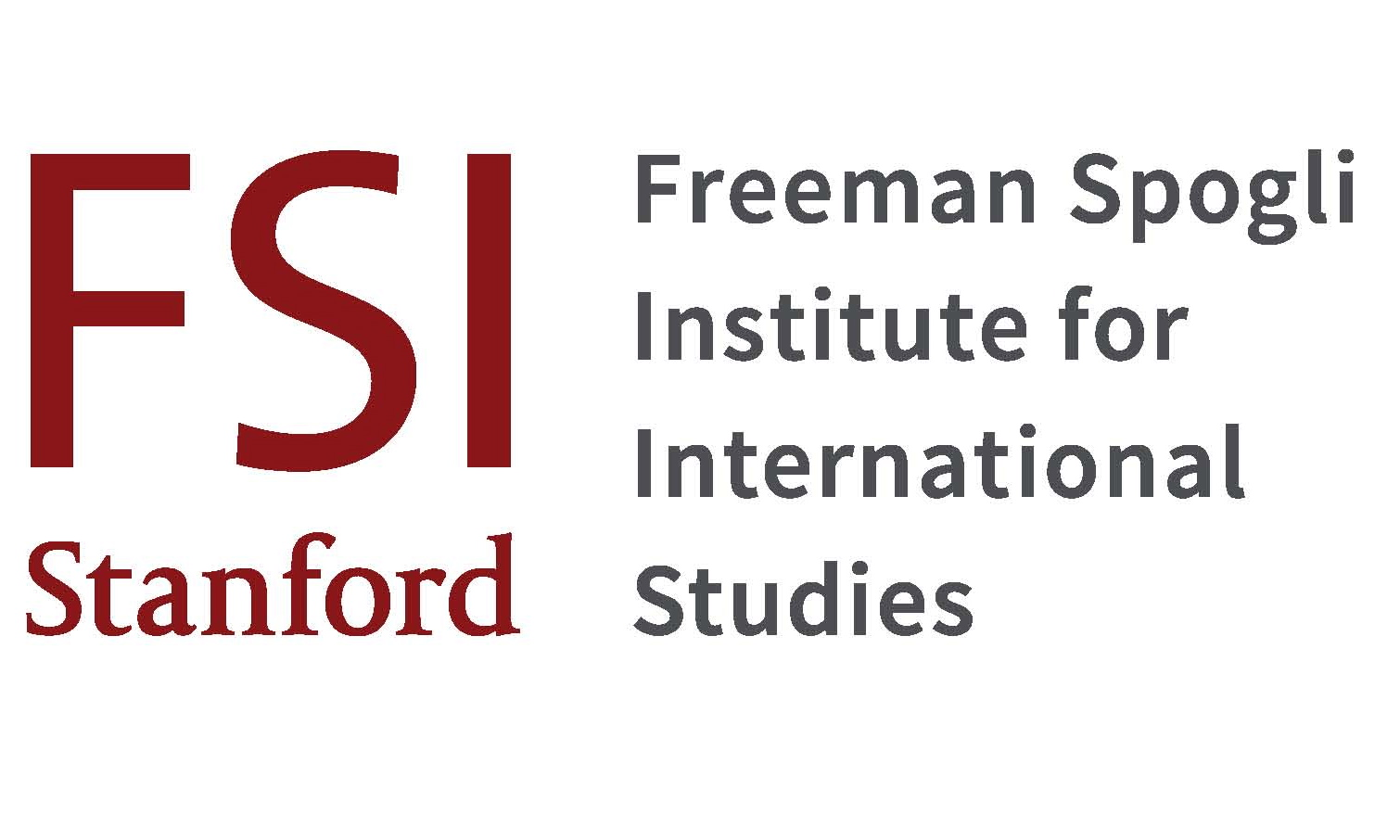

The Freeman Spogli Institute for International Studies is a university-wide research and teaching institution at Stanford devoted to understanding international problems, policies, and institutions. The institute produces interdisciplinary scholarly research, engages in outreach to policymakers and public institutions throughout the world, and trains scholars and future leaders on international issues. Its teaching programs include the graduate-level Master of International Policy as well as honors programs in international security and in democracy, development, and the rule of law. The school is a full member of the Association of Professional Schools of International Affairs (APSIA), a group of schools of public policy, public administration, and international studies.

FSI's core and affiliated faculty represent a range of academic backgrounds and perspectives, including medicine, law, engineering, history, political science, economics, and sociology. The faculty's research and teaching focus on a variety of issues, including governance, domestic and international health policy, migration, development, and security. Their work often examines regional dynamics in areas such as Asia, Europe, Africa and Latin America. FSI faculty conduct research, lead interdisciplinary research programs, educate graduate and undergraduate students, and organize policy outreach that engages Stanford in addressing some of the world's most pressing problems.

The institute is composed of 12 centers and programs, including nine major research centers:

- Center on Democracy, Development and the Rule of Law (CDDRL)
- Center on Food Security and the Environment (FSE)
- Stanford Health Policy (SHP)
- Center for International Security and Cooperation (CISAC)
- The Gordian Knot Center for National Security Innovation (GKC)
- The Europe Center (TEC)
- The Cyber Policy Center (CYBER)
- The Stanford Center on China's Economy and Institutions (SCCEI)
- Walter H. Shorenstein Asia–Pacific Research Center (APARC)

==== History ====
The institute was founded in 1987 following a faculty committee review that concluded Stanford "should be leading the way in International Studies as we do in science and technology", encompassing interdisciplinary teaching, research, public service and administrative functions. It was first called the institute for International Studies, and was created under the direction of former Stanford president Richard Wall Lyman.

The institute was renamed the Freeman Spogli Institute for International Studies in 2005 following a $50 million gift made by Stanford alumni Bradford M. Freeman and Ronald P. Spogli.

The immediate past director of FSI was Mariano-Florentino Cuéllar, the former Stanley Morrison Professor of Law at Stanford Law School and former official in the Obama and Clinton presidential administrations who then served on the California Supreme Court and as president of the Carnegie Endowment for International Peace. Previous directors include Stanford President Emeritus Gerhard Casper; Coit D. Blacker, who served as Special Assistant to the President for National Security Affairs and Senior Director for Russian, Ukrainian and Eurasian Affairs at the National Security Council under National Security Advisor Anthony Lake during the Clinton administration; David Holloway; Walter Falcon; and Stanford President Emeritus Richard Lyman.

FSI appoints faculty and research staff, funds research and scholarly initiatives, directs research projects, and sponsors lectures, policy seminars and conferences. By tradition, FSI undertakes joint faculty appointments with Stanford's seven schools and draws faculty together from the university's academic departments and schools to conduct interdisciplinary research on international issues that transcend academic boundaries.

The institute is home to 40 billeted faculty members – most with joint appointments – and 115 affiliated faculty members with a wide range of academic perspectives.

In addition to its nine centers, the institute sponsors the Ford Dorsey Master's in International Policy, the Inter-University Center for Japanese Language Studies, the Program on Energy & Sustainable Development, the Rural Education Action Program, the Stanford Center at Peking University, and the Stanford Program on International and Cross-Cultural Education.

==== Directors ====
- 2026-present Colin Kahl
- 2015–2026 Michael McFaul
- 2013–2015 Mariano-Florentino Cuéllar
- 2012–2013 Gerhard Casper
- 2003–2012 Coit D. Blacker
- 1998–2003 David Holloway
- 1991–1998 Walter Falcon
- 1987–1991 Richard Wall Lyman

=== Stanford Humanities Center ===
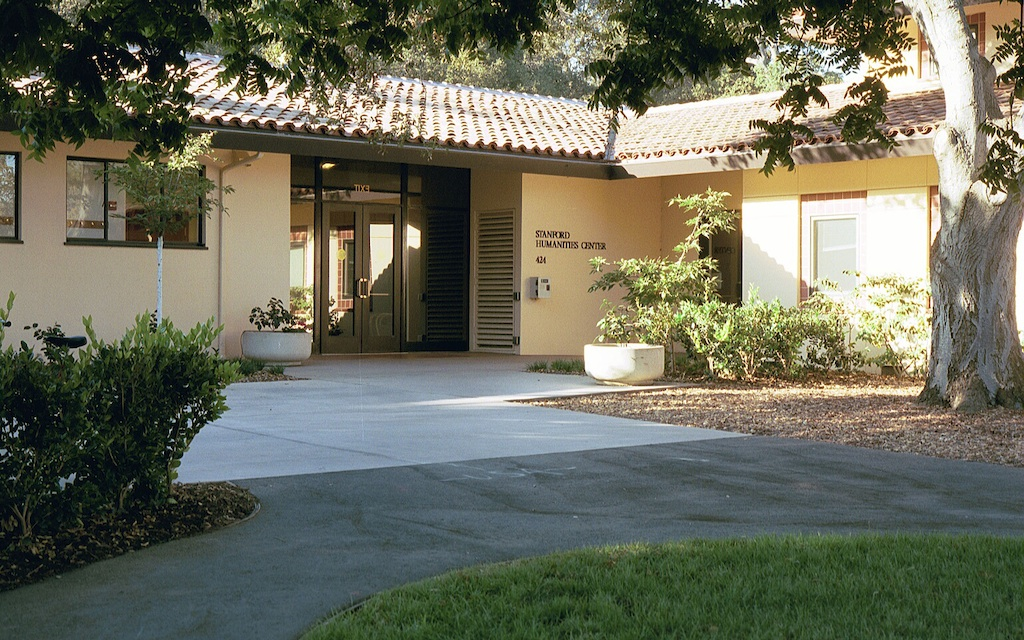
The Stanford Humanities Center

Founded in 1980, the Stanford Humanities Center is a multidisciplinary research institute dedicated to advancing knowledge about culture, philosophy, history, and the arts.

==== History ====
Since its founding in 1980, the Stanford Humanities Center has been sponsoring advanced research into the historical, philosophical, literary, artistic, and cultural dimensions of the human experience. The Humanities Center's annual fellows, international visitors, research workshops, digital humanities laboratory, and roughly fifty annual public events aim to strengthen the intellectual and creative life of the university, foster innovative and interdisciplinary scholarship and teaching, and enrich our understanding of our common humanity. The humanities support democratic culture by nurturing an informed citizenry and seeking solutions to society's most formidable challenges.

==== Fellowships ====
The center offers approximately forty yearlong residential fellowships to Stanford and non-Stanford scholars at different career stages, giving them the opportunity to pursue their research in a supportive intellectual community.

The Humanities Center awards Hume Honors Fellowships to Stanford undergraduates writing a seniors honors thesis in a humanities department. In residence for an academic year, Hume Fellows contribute to the collegial life of the center and receive intellectual guidance and mentoring from staff and fellows.

==== Research workshops ====
Each year, Stanford faculty and graduate students create fifteen diverse research workshops to ask new intellectual questions that often challenge disciplinary boundaries. In addition to providing a space for incubating new ideas in a collegial setting, the workshops professionalize graduate students by introducing them to the conventions of academic life.

==== Manuscript workshops ====
Assembling a team of faculty experts from Stanford and other universities, the Manuscript workshops provide critical feedback to junior faculty preparing monographs or other academic manuscripts of similar scope for submission for publication.

==== Public lectures ====
The center brings scholars, public intellectuals and critics to the Stanford campus for lectures and interdisciplinary conferences intended to enrich the Stanford community through an exchange of ideas. Speakers have included Isabel Allende, Roger Chartier, Stephen Jay Gould, Douglas Hofstadter, Gayatri Spivak, Marilynne Robinson, David Adjaye, David Eggers, and other well-known scholars.

==== Digital humanities ====
The Humanities Center, with the Center for Spatial and Textual Analysis (CESTA), is expanding the possibilities of humanities research and teaching at Stanford by creating opportunities for the discovery and dissemination of new knowledge. Humanities Center scholars are on the forefront of innovation with access to new digital tools to interpret the human experience.

==== International visitors program ====
The center's short-term visitorships draw distinguished international scholars to Stanford to share their research in lectures and seminars with Stanford faculty and students.

==== Directors ====
- Ian P. Watt (1980–1985)
- Bliss Carnochan (1985–1991)
- Herbert Lindenberger (1991–1992; interim)
- Wanda Corn (1992–1995)
- Keith Baker (1995–2000)
- Peter Stansky (2000–2001)
- John Bender (2001–2008)
- Aron Rodrigue (2008–2013)
- Caroline Winterer (2013–2019)
- Roland Greene (2019–Present)

=== Distinguished Careers Institute ===
The Distinguished Careers Institute (DCI), established in 2014, is a year-long residential fellowship for approximately 20 individuals who have already established leadership careers. Fellows are selected based on "how their participation in the program will shape their future life journeys" as well as "what future Fellows will contribute to the program and the broader global community."

=== Stanford High School Program ===
The collaboration among Stanford University's office for Digital Education, the Department of Computer Science, and the Graduate School of Education established Stanford's first dual-enrollment program for high school students from underrepresented backgrounds, which served as an impetus for the establishment of the Qualia Global Scholars Program.

== Other research centers ==
=== Stanford Artificial Intelligence Laboratory ===
The Stanford Artificial Intelligence Laboratory (also known as the Stanford AI Lab, or SAIL) is the artificial intelligence (AI) research laboratory of Stanford University. The current director is Professor Christopher D. Manning.

==== Early years ====
SAIL was started in 1963 by John McCarthy, after he moved from Massachusetts Institute of Technology to Stanford. Lester D. "Les" Earnest, also previously of MIT, served as executive officer (self-deprecatingly, "Chief Bureaucrat") at SAIL from 1965 to 1980. During almost all of this period (1966–1979), SAIL was housed in the D.C. Power building, named not for "Direct Current" but rather for Donald Clinton Power, who held the positions of president, C.E.O. and chairman of General Telephone & Electronics Corporation (later GTE Corporation) between 1951 and 1971. GT&E donated the unfinished building to Stanford University after abandoning plans to establish a research center there. During this period SAIL was one of the leading centers for AI research and an early ARPANET site.

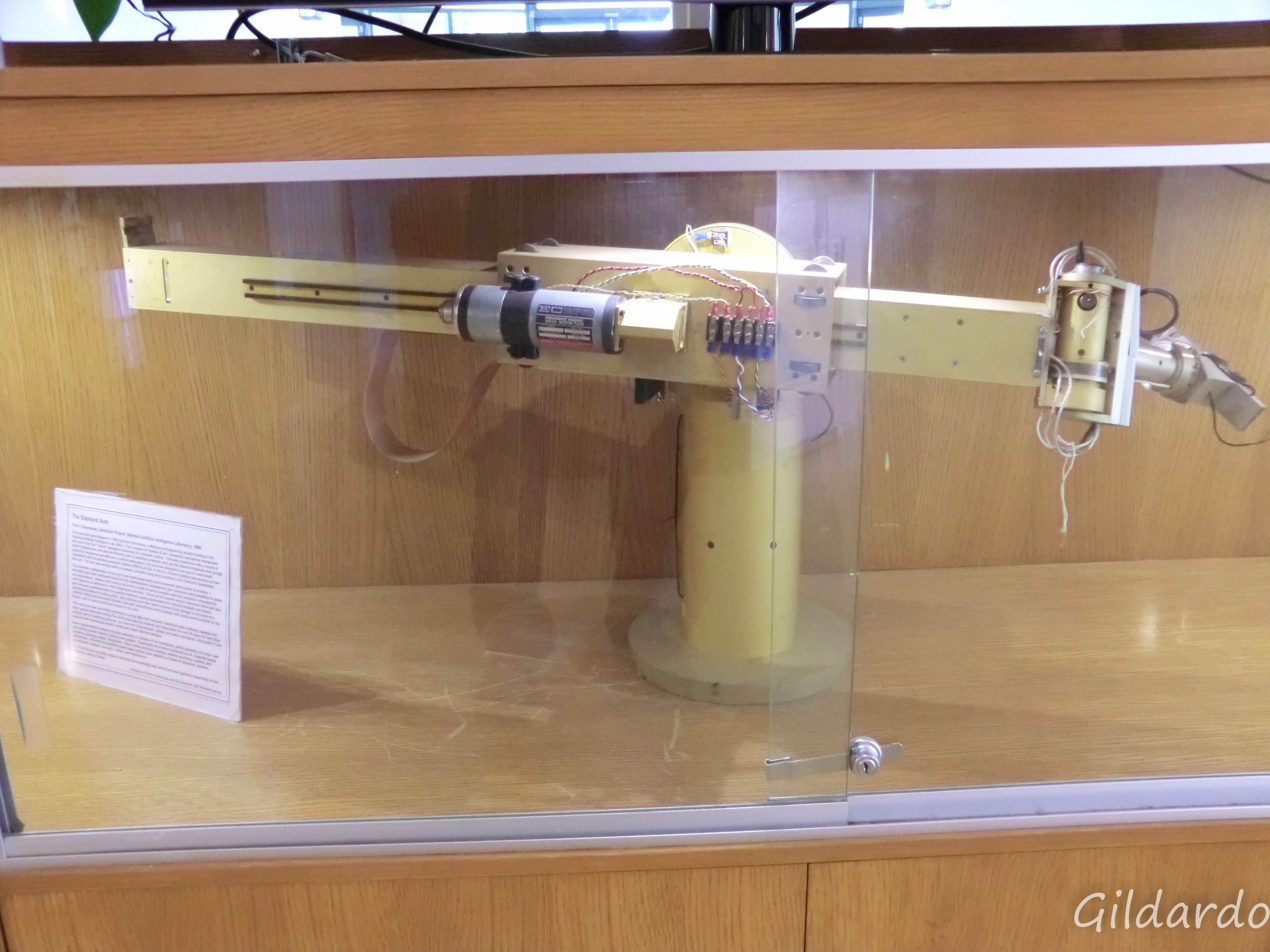
The Stanford arm, designed at SAIL in 1969, is the forerunner of most industrial robots in use today.

D.C. Power was on a hill overlooking Felt Lake in the foothills of the Santa Cruz Mountains behind Stanford. It was about 5 miles (8 km) from the main campus, at 1600 Arastradero Road, midway between Page Mill Road and Alpine Road. This area was, and remains, quite rural in nature. Combined with the rather extreme 1960s architecture of the place, this remote setting led to a certain isolation. Some people who worked there reported feeling as if they were already in the future. The building was demolished in 1986; as of 2003, the site is home to Portola Pastures (an equestrian center adjacent to the Arastradero Open Space Preserve).

SAIL created the WAITS operating system on a computer called SAIL. WAITS ran on various models of Digital Equipment Corporation PDP computers, starting with the PDP-6, then the KA10 and KL10. WAITS also ran on Foonly systems at CCRMA and LLL. The SAIL system was shut down in 1991.

SAIL, the Stanford Artificial Intelligence Language, was developed by Dan Swinehart and Bob Sproull of the Stanford AI Lab in 1970.

Around 1972, for its remote site use, people at SAIL developed a computer controlled vending machine, adapted from a machine rented from Canteen Vending, which sold for cash or, though a computer terminal (Teletype Model 33 KSR), on credit. Products included, at least, beer, yogurt, and milk. It was called the Prancing Pony, after the name of the room, named after an inn in Tolkien's Lord of the Rings, as each room at SAIL was named after a place in Middle Earth. A successor version still operates in the Computer Science Department at Stanford, with both hardware and software having been updated.

Alumni of the original SAIL played a major role in many Silicon Valley firms, becoming founders of now-large firms such as Cisco Systems and Sun Microsystems as well as smaller companies such as Vicarm Inc. (acquired by Unimation), Foonly, Elxsi, Imagen, Xidex, Valid Logic Systems, and D.E. Shaw & Co. Research accomplishments at SAIL were many, including in the fields of speech recognition and robotics. Notable people that worked at the original SAIL include Raj Reddy, Hans Moravec, Alan Kay, Victor Scheinman, Larry Tesler, Don Knuth, and Edward Feigenbaum.

==== Demise and rebirth ====
In 1979, SAIL's activities were merged into the university's Computer Science Department and it moved into Margaret Jacks Hall on the main Stanford campus.

After operating for more than 15 Years under the name Robotics Lab, we just re-inaugurated the new Stanford AI Lab. (April 2004)

SAIL was reopened in 2004, now in the Gates Computer Science Building, with Sebastian Thrun becoming its new director. SAIL's 21st century mission is to "change the way we understand the world"; its researchers contribute to fields such as bioinformatics, cognition, computational geometry, computer vision, decision theory, distributed systems, game theory, general game playing, image processing, information retrieval, knowledge systems, logic, machine learning, multi-agent systems, natural language, neural networks, planning, probabilistic inference, sensor networks, and robotics. The best-known achievement of the new SAIL is the Stanley self-driving car that won the 2005 DARPA Grand Challenge.

Knowledge Systems Laboratory (KSL) was an artificial intelligence research laboratory within the Department of Computer Science at Stanford University until 2007, located in the Gates Computer Science Building, Stanford.

=== Stanford Center for Entrepreneurial Studies ===
The Center for Entrepreneurial Studies (CES) at Stanford University is a multidisciplinary business oriented program targeted to both undergraduate and graduate students. It incorporates courses from Stanford University School of Engineering and Stanford Graduate School of Business. It also incorporates Stanford Mayfield Scholars Program that seeks to give select undergraduate students an opportunity to take business related coursework and to intern in high tech startups. CES was founded by Tom Byers and Charles A. Holloway.

=== Center for Computer Research in Music and Acoustics ===
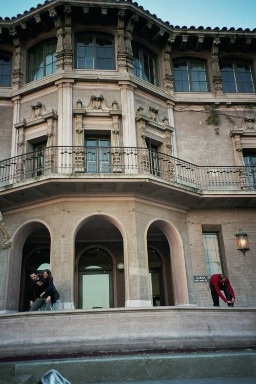
The Knoll, home to CCRMA

The Stanford University Center for Computer Research in Music and Acoustics (CCRMA), founded by John Chowning, is a multi-discipline facility where composers and researchers work together using computer-based technology both as an artistic medium and as a research tool. CCRMA's director is Chris Chafe. CCRMA's current faculty includes a mix of musicians and engineers including Julius Smith, Jonathan Berger, Ge Wang, Takako Fujioka, Tom Rossing, Jonathan Abel, Marina Bosi, David Berners, Patricia Alessandrini, Jay Kadis, and Fernando Lopez-Lezcano. Emeritus professor Max Mathews died in 2011.

Widely used digital sound synthesis techniques like FM synthesis and digital waveguide synthesis were developed at CCRMA and licensed to industry partners. The FM synthesis patent brought Stanford $20 million before it expired, making it (in 1994) "the second most lucrative licensing agreement in Stanford's history".

Stanford CCRMA is a research center, studying areas of audio and technology including composition, computer music, physical modeling, audio signal processing, sound recording and reproduction, psychoacoustics, acoustics, music information retrieval, audio networking, and spatial sound. The center houses academic courses for Stanford students as well as seminars, small interest group meetings, summer workshops and colloquia for the broader community. Concerts of computer and experimental music are presented regularly throughout year.

==== The Knoll ====
Almost 100 years ago, this Spanish Gothic residence, known as the Knoll, was originally designed by Louis Christian Mullgardt, and built as a residence for the university's president. In 1946, the building became home to the Music Department, and then in 1986, CCRMA took over residency.

Damaged in 1989 during the Loma Prieta earthquake, the Knoll nonetheless housed CCRMA in its damaged condition until a complete internal reconstruction between 2004 and 2005. The reopening of the facility was celebrated in the Spring of 2005 with the CCRMA: newStage Festival. This unique building now comprises several state-of-the-art music studios and top-notch research facilities, hosting a variety of students, artists and scientists.

CCRMA is affiliated with the Center for Computer Assisted Research in the Humanities (CCARH), also located at Stanford. CCARH conducts research on constructing computer databases for music and on creating programs that allow researchers to access, analyze, print, and electronically perform the music.

=== Stanford Institute for Creativity and the Arts (SiCa) ===
The Stanford Institute for Creativity and the Arts (SiCa), established in 2006, serves as the core programmatic hub for the Stanford Arts Initiative, leading the development of new undergraduate arts programs, hosting artists in residence, awarding grants for multidisciplinary arts research and teaching, incubating collaborative performances and exhibitions with campus partners and other institutions, and providing centralized communication for arts events and programs at Stanford University.

=== National Performance of Dams Program ===
The Department of Civil and Environmental Engineering maintains the National Performance of Dams Program, a national database of structural and operational data related to dam systems in the U.S. Begun in 1994, this program provides data to the dam engineering and safety community about the in-service performance of dam systems. The analysis of this data covering both successful operations and incidents, including failures, is intended to lead to improvements in design and requirements, engineering processes and standards, operational procedures and guidelines, and public policy development.

=== Michelle R. Clayman Institute for Gender Research ===
Founded in 1974, and named after economist Michelle R. Clayman, the Michelle R. Clayman Institute for Gender Research at Stanford University is one of the nation's oldest research organizations focused on the study of gender. The Clayman Institute designs basic interdisciplinary research, creates knowledge, networks people and ideas at Stanford, nationally, and internationally to effect change and promote gender equality. The Clayman Institute plays an integral role in the Stanford community by bringing together local, national and international scholars and thought leaders from across disciplines to create knowledge and effect change. The place where the Clayman Institute is located was renamed the Carolyn Lewis Attneave House in 2019. It was formerly named Serra House after Junípero Serra.

==== History ====
In 1972 faculty and graduate students in the feminist movement were the impetus behind the formation of the institute. In 1974, the Center for Research on Women (CROW) was the first interdisciplinary center or institute of its kind and quickly built a strong reputation under the direction of Myra Strober, the founding Director. The reputation of CIGR grew outside Stanford, and the University of Chicago Press chose Stanford as the base of the second five-year rotation of its new interdisciplinary journal, Signs. In 1983 the institute was renamed the Institute for Research on Women and Gender (IRWG) and continued to expand the gender conversation with the "Difficult Dialogues" program, which ran in the 1990s through 2004. In 2004, the new director, Professor Londa Schiebinger, a historian of science, formed a plan to create a series of research initiatives on gender issues, backed by a research fellowship program, that would attract scholars from Stanford and abroad. With the help of matching funds from the Hewlett Foundation and strong support from the institute's Advisory Council, Schiebinger spearheaded a fundraising drive to create an endowment for the institute. IRWG was renamed in honor of Michelle R. Clayman, the major donor in the campaign, who serves as the chair of the institute's Advisory Council.

==== Research ====
The Clayman Institute designs basic research and supports the creation of knowledge through its Fellowships and interdisciplinary programs. Recent reports/publications include:

- Gendered Innovations in Science and Engineering, Londa Schiebinger, ed., 2008.
- Dual-Career Academic Couples: What Universities Need to Know. The Michelle R. Clayman Institute, 2008. This Clayman Institute research study shows that over 70% of faculty are in dual-career relationships. This report tackles tough questions and recommends policies to maximize options.
- Climbing the Technical Ladder: Obstacles and Solutions for Mid-Level Women in Information Technology. The Michelle R. Clayman Institute and the Anita Borg Institute, 2008. This report provides an in-depth look into the barriers to retention and advancement of technical women in Silicon Valley's high tech industry and provides practical recommendations to employers on overcoming these barriers.

==== Fellowships ====
The Clayman Institute runs two fellowship programs. The Faculty Research Fellowships seek to drive intellectual and social innovation through interdisciplinary gender studies. They include residential fellowships for tenured, tenure-track, and postdoctoral scholars from Stanford University, and U.S. and foreign universities. The Clayman Institute also offers Graduate Dissertation Fellowships for Stanford University doctoral students. Fellowships are awarded to students who are in the writing stages of their dissertations, and whose research focuses on women and/or gender.

==== Directors ====
- 1974–77 Myra Strober
- 1977–79 Diane Middlebrook
- 1979–84 Myra Strober
- 1984–85 Marilyn Yalom (deputy director, as acting director)
- 1985–86 Judith Brown (acting director)
- 1986–90 Deborah Rhode
- 1990–97 Iris Litt
- 1997–2001 Laura Carstensen
- 2001–04 Barbara Gelpi (acting director)
- 2004–10 Londa Schiebinger
- 2010–2019 Shelley J. Correll
- 2019-present Adrian Daub

=== Martin Luther King Jr. Research and Education Institute ===
Stanford is home to the Martin Luther King Jr. Research and Education Institute which grew out of and still contains the Martin Luther King Jr. Papers Project, a collaboration with the King Center to publish the King papers held by the King Center.

=== Stanford Internet Observatory ===
The Stanford Internet Observatory is a multidisciplinary program for the study of abuse in information technologies, with a focus on social media, established in 2019. It is part of the Stanford Cyber Policy Center, a joint initiative of the Freeman Spogli Institute for International Studies and Stanford Law School. The Observatory has identified the Russian government's online involvement in global elections since the program began. The program's projects such as the "Virality Project" have been criticized as censorship since the release of the Twitter files by some students, Matt Taibbi, and others outside the university.

=== Stanford Institute for Human-Centered Artificial Intelligence (HAI) ===
Stanford HAI was founded in 2019 by Fei-Fei Li, John Etchemendy, James Landay, and Chris Manning. HAI's mission is to advance AI research that prioritizes human well-being, fostering collaboration across disciplines to ensure AI is developed ethically and inclusively.

In its first five years, HAI has directed over $40 million into AI research, supported over 300 scholars, and launched specialized centers like the Stanford Digital Economy Lab and the Center for Research on Foundation Models. The institute has also fostered partnerships with policymakers and industry leaders, advocating for the democratization of AI research. HAI continues to push for new models of collaboration, emphasizing the need for large-scale resources to address the growing complexity of AI systems.

==== Stanford HAI's role in Governor Gavin Newsom's AI policy ====
The Stanford Institute for Human-Centered Artificial Intelligence (HAI) is a contributor to California Governor Gavin Newsom's policy initiatives focused on the safe and responsible development of artificial intelligence (AI) in California. Fei-Fei Li has advosed the state on AI policy, contributing to initiatives aimed at balancing innovation with risk mitigation.

Building on the partnership established by Newsom's 2023 executive order, Newsom asked Stanford HAI to continue developing empirical, science-based guidelines for the deployment of generative AI (GenAI). This future work will focus on assessing the potential risks and benefits of frontier AI models, crafting adaptive policies, and ensuring that California remains at the forefront of AI governance. Newsom's administration relies on HAI's expertise to navigate AI's rapid advancements while protecting the public from potential harms.

== Affiliations ==
Stanford's Center for Computer Research and Acoustics is part of a consortium with CNMAT and the Institut de Recherche et Coordination Acoustique/Musique (IRCAM) in Paris.

== See also ==
- Hoover Institution, a conservative think tank affiliated with Stanford. It has staffed numerous positions for Republican presidents from Richard Nixon to Donald Trump.
- SLAC National Accelerator Laboratory, a particle physics research facility. Run by Stanford University under the programmatic direction of the United States Department of Energy
- SRI International, originally the Stanford Research Institute, but independent since 1970
