= Slingshot argument =

Argument in philosophical logic

In philosophical logic, a slingshot argument is one of a group of arguments claiming to show that all true sentences stand for the same thing.

This type of argument was dubbed the "slingshot" by philosophers Jon Barwise and John Perry (1981) due to its disarming simplicity. It is usually said that versions of the slingshot argument have been given by Gottlob Frege, Alonzo Church, W. V. Quine, and Donald Davidson. However, it has been disputed by Lorenz Krüger (1995) that there is much unity in this tradition. Moreover, Krüger rejects Davidson's claim that the argument can refute the correspondence theory of truth. Stephen Neale (1995) claims, controversially, that the most compelling version was suggested by Kurt Gödel (1944).

These arguments are sometimes modified to support the alternative, and evidently stronger, conclusion that there is only one fact, or one true proposition, state of affairs, truth condition, truthmaker, and so on.

== The argument ==
One version of the argument (Perry 1996) proceeds as follows.

Assumptions:

1. Substitution. If two terms designate the same thing, then substituting one for another in a sentence does not change the designation of that sentence.
2. Redistribution. Rearranging the parts of a sentence does not change the designation of that sentence, provided the truth conditions of the sentence do not change.
3. Every sentence is equivalent to a sentence of the form F(a). In other words, every sentence has the same designation as some sentence that attributes a property to something. (For example, "All men are mortal" is equivalent to "The number 1 has the property of being such that all men are mortal".)
4. For any two objects there is a relation that holds uniquely between them. (For example, if the objects in question are denoted by "a" and "b", the relation in question might be R(x, y), which is stipulated to hold just in case x = a and y = b.)

Let S and T be arbitrary true sentences, designating Des(S) and Des(T), respectively. (No assumptions are made about what kinds of things Des(S) and Des(T) are.) It is now shown by a series of designation-preserving transformations that Des(S) = Des(T). Here, "$\iota x$" can be read as "the x such that".

| 1. | $S$ |
| 2. | $\phi (a)$ | assumption 3 |
| 3. | $a = \iota x (\phi (x) \land x=a)$ | redistribution |
| 4. | $a = \iota x (\pi (x,b) \land x=a)$ | substitution, assumption 4 |
| 5. | $\pi (a,b)$ | redistribution |
| 6. | $b = \iota x (\pi (a,x) \land x=b )$ | redistribution |
| 7. | $b = \iota x (\psi (x) \land x=b )$ | substitution, assumption 3 |
| 8. | $\psi (b)$ | redistribution |
| 9. | $T$ | assumption 3 |

Note that (1)-(9) is not a derivation of T from S. Rather, it is a series of (allegedly) designation-preserving transformation steps.

== Responses to the argument ==
As Gödel (1944) observed, the slingshot argument does not go through if Bertrand Russell's famous account of definite descriptions is assumed. Russell claimed that the proper logical interpretation of a sentence of the form "The F is G" is:

Exactly one thing is F, and that thing is also G.

Or, in the language of first-order logic:

$$\exists x (\forall y (F(y) \leftrightarrow y = x) \land G(x))$$

When the sentences above containing $\iota$-expressions are expanded out to their proper form, the steps involving substitution are seen to be illegitimate. Consider, for example, the move from (3) to (4). On Russell's account, (3) and (4) are shorthand for:

| 3'. | $\exists x (\forall y ((\phi(y) \land y=a) \leftrightarrow y = x) \land a = x)$ |
| 4'. | $\exists x (\forall y ((\pi (y,b) \land y=a) \leftrightarrow y = x) \land a = x)$ |

Clearly the substitution principle and assumption 4 do not license the move from (3') to (4'). Thus, one way to look at the slingshot is as simply another argument in favor of Russell's theory of definite descriptions.

If one is not willing to accept Russell's theory, then it seems wise to challenge either substitution or redistribution, which seem to be the other weakest points in the argument. Perry (1996), for example, rejects both of these principles, proposing to replace them with certain weaker, qualified versions that do not allow the slingshot argument to go through.

== See also ==
- Abstraction
- Logic of information
- Charles Sanders Peirce bibliography
