= List of honorary fellows of St Anne's College, Oxford =

This is a list of current and past Honorary Fellows of St Anne's College, Oxford.

- Jane Aitken
- Sir Danny Alexander
- Sunao Aoki
- Dame Mary Archer
- Jackie Ashley
- Dame Janet Baker
- Dame Gillian Beer
- Anna Biegun
- Sir Winfried Bischoff
- Dame Frances Cairncross
- Javier Cercas
- Michelle Clayman
- Helen Danson
- Michael Danson
- Ruth Deech
- Sir Simon Donaldson
- Sir Peter Donnelly
- Paul Donovan
- Irene Dorner
- Vincent Gillespie
- Devaki Jain
- Elizabeth Jeffreys

== See also ==
- Category:Alumni of St Anne's College, Oxford
- Category:Fellows of St Anne's College, Oxford
