= John Newsome Crossley =

British-Australian mathematician and logician

- Born: 28 September 1937 (age 88); Yorkshire, England
- Education: University of Oxford; Monash University
- Scientific career
- Fields: Mathematics
- Doctoral advisor: Kenneth A. H. Gravett
- Doctoral students: Peter Aczel; Wilfrid Hodges

John Newsome Crossley (born 28 September 1937) is a British-Australian mathematician and logician who writes in the field of logic in computer science, history of mathematics and medieval history. He is involved in the field of mathematical logic in Australia and South East Asia.

As of 2010, Crossley is Emeritus Professor of Logic at Monash University, Australia, to which he has been connected since 1968.

== Biography ==
Crossley was educated at Queen Elizabeth Grammar School, Wakefield, and then went up to St John's College, Oxford. He was a Harmsworth Senior Scholar at Merton College from 1960 to 1962, before taking up a one-year Junior Research Fellowship there; he received his DPhil and MA (Mathematics) in 1963. His early career was spent at Oxford where he was the first university lecturer in mathematical logic and was a Fellow of All Souls College, Oxford. He is still a Quondam Fellow there. He was offered a Readership position and following a lecturing visit to Monash University in 1968, he was elected to a Chair in Pure Mathematics. He accepted this position and as of 2010, Crossley continues to be active at Monash University where he serves through its Faculty of Information Technology.

Crossley has written books in logic, mathematics and computer science. He is known as the lead author of the book What is Mathematical Logic. Co-written with some of his students, the book popularized the subject to the interested layman. Many of Crossley's doctoral students have gone on to be professors themselves and have written books in the field of mathematics or computing, including Peter Aczel, Wilfrid Hodges, John Lane Bell and Rod Downey.

Crossley is also an avid photographer. In 1974 he first exhibited his photographs in Melbourne and again in 2005 he exhibited Composition and Context, a collection of photographs shot by Crossley around the world that illustrates the title and theme of the exhibition. A number of these photographs since have appeared in publications in Australia, Britain and the Philippines.

== Publications ==
=== Books ===
- Constructive Order Types John N. Crossley North-Holland Publishing Company, Amsterdam, 1969
- What is Mathematical Logic John N. Crossley et al. Oxford University Press, 1972
- Combinatorial Functors John N. Crossley and Anil Nerode, Ergebnisse der Mathematik und ihrer Grenzgebiete, Springer, Berlin, 1974
- The emergence of number John Newsome Crossley, World Scientific, Singapore, 1987
- Nine Chapters on the Mathematical Art -- Companion & Commentary, Shen Kangshen, John N. Crossley and Anthony W.-C. Lun. Oxford University Press, 1999
- Adapting proofs-as-programs: The Curry-Howard Protocol, Iman Hafiz Poernomo, John Newsome Crossley and Martin Wirsing, Springer Monographs in Computer Science, Springer, New York, 2005
- Growing ideas of number John N. Crossley Australian Council for Educational Research, Camberwell, 2007
- Ars musice Constant J. Mews, John N. Crossley, Catherine Jeffreys, Leigh McKinnon, and Carol Williams (ed and trans.), Johannes de Grocheio. Consortium on the Teaching of the Middle Ages (TEAMS), Kalamazoo, MI., 2011
