= Iris F. Litt =

Dr. Iris F Litt (born 1940) is an American physician, professor, and medical director who specializes in pediatrics and adolescent health. She has achieved multiple honors through her teaching and research in different areas of adolescent and pediatric health.

== Early life ==
Iris F. Litt was born in 1940 in Brooklyn, New York. Starting at a young age, she would go with her father, a general practitioner, to house calls. After high school, she attended Cornell University in Ithaca, New York. Cornell University is where she graduated from in 1961 with a Bachelor of Arts degree. She attended medical school at the State University of New York Downstate Medical Center where she graduated from in 1965. Dr. Litt stayed in New York after medical school graduation, completing her residency at the New York Hospital where she eventually specialized in pediatrics. After her residency she became board certified in pediatrics.

== Medical career ==
After completing her residency, in 1967 she taught at Cornell Medical College. Teaching at Cornell Medical College for only a year, she then moved to Albert Einstein College of Medicine to teach pediatric medicine from 1968 to 1970. Along with her teaching at Albert Einstein, in 1968 she became the Director of Juvenile Center Service of the Division of Adolescent Medicine at Montefiore Hospital. After six years of being the Director at the Juvenile Center, in 1974 she became the Director at Rikers Island Prison Health Services until 1976. After leaving the position at Rikers Island in 1976 she founded the Division of Adolescent Medicine at Stanford University's Department of Pediatrics later becoming the Director where she held the position for 7 years until 1997. Along with being the Director, she began to teach at Stanford University in 1976 and helped direct the Institute of Research on Women and Gender. She still devotes some of her time to teach at Stanford University as a Professor in pediatrics. The research institute has since been renamed to the Clayman Institute for Gender Research. Due to her work at The Clayman Institute, a fund was created in her honor named the Iris F. Litt M.D. Fund. This fund is used for two different fellowships in the gender and medicine department. Through her schooling in adolescent health, she has done research on health care in juvenile detention facilities. This led to her co publishing an article on the topic in the American Journal of Public Health with Dr. Michael I. Cohen.

== Achievements and awards ==
=== Achievements ===
Litt founded the Division of Adolescent Medicine at Stanford University's Department of Pediatrics in 1976. From 1976 to 2007 she was the Chief of Division of Adolescent Medicine at Stanford University. During the same time she was the Director of the Clayman Institute where she still continues research and other work. As she held both of those positions, she was also the Editor and Chief of the Journal of Adolescent Health from 1990 to 2004. Her most recent position achievement was her place as Director for the Center for Advanced Study in the Behavioral Sciences from 2009 to 2014. She was the first female and first physician to become the Director of the Center for Advanced Study in the Behavioral Sciences.

=== Awards ===
In 1992, she was given the Outstanding Achievement Award in Adolescent Medicine from the Society for Adolescent Health and Medicine. In 1996 she was named in Best Doctors in America. In 2002 she was honored by Stanford University with the Marron and Mary Elizabeth Kendrick Professorship in Pediatrics award. In 2007 she was honored with becoming emerita, retiring from her position but being honored with keeping the title of the position. She is also an elected member of the National Academy of Medicine.
