= Language, Proof and Logic =

Language, Proof and Logic is an educational software package, devised and written by Jon Barwise and John Etchemendy, geared to teaching formal logic through the use of a tight integration between a textbook (same name as the package) and four software programs, where three of them are logic related (Boole, Fitch and Tarski's World) and the other (Submit) is an internet-based grading service. The name is a pun derived from Language, Truth, and Logic, the philosophy book by A. J. Ayer.

On September 2, 2014, there was launched a massive open online course (MOOC) with the same name, which utilizes this educational software package.

== Description ==
A short description of the programs:

- Boole (named after George Boole) - a program that facilitates the construction and checking of truth tables and related notions (tautology, tautological consequence, etc.);
- Fitch (named after Frederic Brenton Fitch) - a natural deduction proof environment in Fitch-style calculus for giving and checking first-order proofs;
- Tarski's World (named after Alfred Tarski) - a program that teaches the basic first-order language and its semantics using a model theoretic-like approach, where the "world" consists of a little grid and some simple objects;
- Submit - a program that allows students to submit exercises done with the above programs to the Grade Grinder, the online grading service.
