= A Dialogue on Personal Identity and Immortality =

1978 book by John Perry

- First edition
- Author: John Perry
- Subject: Personal identity
- Published: 1978
- Publisher: Hackett Publishing Company
- Pages: 56 pp.
- ISBN: 9780915144532

A Dialogue on Personal Identity and Immortality is a book by the philosopher John Perry. It is intended as an undergraduate textbook and has been translated into Spanish, Chinese, Persian and Korean.

== Content ==
It deals with standard problems in the theory of personal identity and its relation to immortality and life after death in the form of a dialogue between a terminally ill university professor at a small Midwestern college, Gretchen Weirob, and her two friends, Sam Miller and Dave Cohen. The views represented include those of Bernard Williams, John Locke, and Derek Parfit. The format of associating different philosophical positions with different characters in a dialogue recalls David Hume's Dialogues Concerning Natural Religion.

== Reception ==
Samuel Clark (from Lancaster University) believes the book to do "a good job of setting out several different views in contest with each other." Eric Todd Olson calls it "an eminently readable discussion of the soul and life after death."
