= Aczel's anti-foundation axiom =

Axiom of set theory proposed by Peter Aczel in 1988

In the foundations of mathematics, Aczel's anti-foundation axiom is an axiom set forth by Peter Aczel (1988), as an alternative to the axiom of foundation in Zermelo–Fraenkel set theory. It states that every accessible pointed directed graph corresponds to exactly one set. In particular, according to this axiom, the graph consisting of a single vertex with a loop corresponds to a set that contains only itself as element, i.e. a Quine atom. A set theory obeying this axiom is necessarily a non-well-founded set theory.

== Accessible pointed graphs ==
An accessible pointed graph is a directed graph with a distinguished vertex (the "root") such that for any node in the graph there is at least one path in the directed graph from the root to that node.

The anti-foundation axiom postulates that each such directed graph corresponds to the membership structure of exactly one set. For example, the directed graph with only one node and an edge from that node to itself corresponds to a set of the form x = {x}.

== See also ==
- von Neumann universe
