= Liar paradox in early Islamic tradition =

Consideration of a paradox by early Islamic philosophers

Many early Islamic philosophers and logicians discussed the liar paradox. Their work on the subject began in the 10th century and continued to Athīr al-Dīn al-Abharī and Nasir al-Din al-Tusi of the middle 13th century and beyond. Although the Liar paradox has been well known in Greek and Latin traditions, the works of Arabic scholars have only recently been translated into English.

Each group of early Islamic philosophers discussed different problems presented by the paradox. They pioneered unique solutions that were not influenced by Western ideas.

== Athīr and the Liar paradox ==
Athīr al-Dīn Mufaḍḍal (b. ʿUmar Abharī, d. 663/1264) was a Persian philosopher, astronomer and mathematician from the city of Abhar in Persia. There is some speculation that his works on the Liar paradox could have been known to Western logicians, and in particular to Thomas Bradwardine.

He analyzed the Liar sentence as follows:

One of the difficult fallacies is the conjunction of the two contradictories (Jamʿal-naqīḍyan) when someone says, “All that I say at this moment is false”. This sentence (qawl) is either true or false. If it is true, then it must be true and false. And if it is not true, then it is necessary that one of his sentences at this moment is true, as long as he utters something. But, he says nothing at this moment other than this sentence. Thus, this sentence is necessarily true and false.

In other words, Athīr says that if the Liar sentence is false, which means that the Liar falsely declares that all he says at the moment is false, then the Liar sentence is true; and, if the Liar sentence is true, which means that the Liar truthfully declares that all he says at the moment is false, then the Liar sentence is false. In any case, the Liar sentence is both true and false at the same time, which is a paradox.

Athīr offers the following solution for the paradox:

To solve the paradox we say: we should not concede that if it is false then one of his sentences (kalām) is true. For its being true is taken to be the conjunction of its being true and being false. Therefore its being false necessitates the non-conjunction of its being true and being false. And the non-conjunction of its being true and being false does not necessitate its being true.

According to the traditional idealization that presumably was used by Athīr, the sentence as a universal proposition is false only, when "either it has a counter-instance or its subject term is empty".

- Other examples of a counter-instance include: it is false to say that all birds could fly because there are some that could not, like for example penguins.
- Other examples of an empty subject term include: it is false to say that all flying carpets have four corners, and not only because some carpets are round or have three corners, but rather because there are no flying carpets at all.

The Liar sentence, however, has neither an empty subject nor counter-instance. This fact creates obstacles for Athīr's view, who must show what is unique about the Liar sentence, and how the Liar sentence still could be only true or false in view of the "true" and "false" conditions set up in the universal proposition's description. Athīr tries to solve the paradox by applying to it the laws of negation of a conjunction and negation of a disjunction.

Ahmed Alwishah, who has a Ph.D. in Islamic Philosophy and David Sanson, who has a Ph.D. in Philosophy explain that Athīr actually claims that:

(1) "It is not the case that, if the Liar Sentence is not both true and false, then it is true."

Alwishah and Sanson continue: "The general principle behind (1) is clear enough: the negation of a conjunction does not entail the negation of a conjunct; so from not both true and false you cannot infer not false and so true. Abharī appears to be saying that the Liar rests on an elementary scope fallacy! But, of course, Abharī is not entitled to (1). In some cases, the negation of a conjunction does entail the negation of a conjunct: 'not both P and P' for example, entails 'not P'. As a general rule, the negation of a conjunction entails the negation of each conjunct whenever the conjuncts are logically equivalent, i.e., whenever the one follows from the other and vice verse. So Abharī is entitled to (1) only if he is entitled to assume that ‘The Liar Sentence is true’ and ‘The Liar Sentence is false’ are not logically equivalent."

The Liar sentence is a universal proposition (The Liar says All I say ...), so "if it is (non–vacuously) false it must have a counter–instance". But in this case scenario, when the only thing that the liar is saying is the single sentence declaring that what he is saying at the moment is false, the only available counter–instance is the Liar sentence itself. When staging the paradox Abharī said: "if it is not true, then it is necessary that one of his sentences at this moment is true, as long as he utters something. But, he says nothing at this moment other than this sentence. Thus, this sentence is necessarily true and false" So the explanation provided by Abharī himself demonstrates that both "'The Liar Sentence is false' and 'The Liar Sentence is true' are logically equivalent. If they are logically equivalent, then, contrary to (1), the negation of the conjunction does entail the negation of each conjunct. Abharī’s 'solution; therefore fails."

== Nasir al-Din al-Tusi on the Liar paradox ==
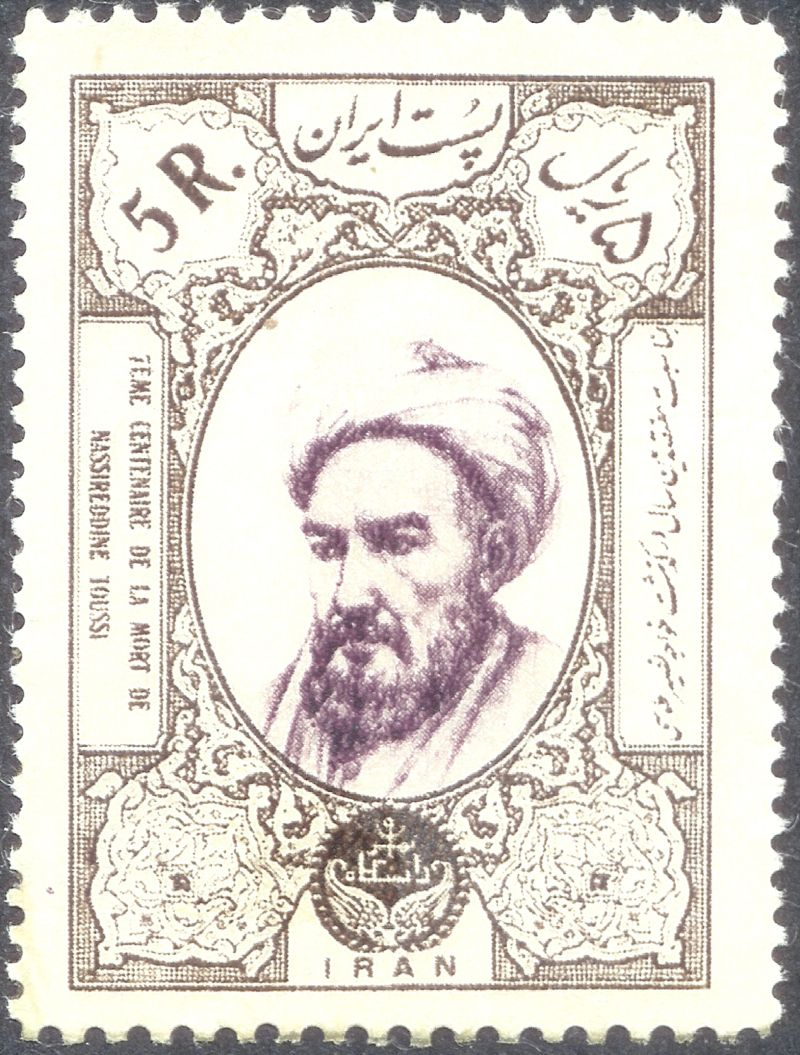
Naṣīr al-Dīn al-Ṭūsī commemorated on an Iranian stamp on the 700th anniversary of his death

Naṣīr al-Dīn al-Ṭūsī was a Persian polymath and prolific writer: an astronomer, biologist, chemist, mathematician, philosopher, physician, physicist, scientist, theologian and Marja Taqleed. He adhered to the Ismaili, and subsequently Twelver Shī‘ah Islamic belief systems. The Arab scholar Ibn Khaldun (1332–1406) considered Tusi to be the greatest of the later Persian scholars.

Ṭūsī's work on the paradox begins with a discussion of the paradox and the solution offered by Abharī, with which Ṭūsī disagrees. As Alwishah and Sanson (2009) point out, "Ṭūsī argues that whatever fancy thing (conjunction, conditional) Abharī wants to identify as the truth condition for the Liar Sentence, it will not matter, because pace Abharī, we can generate the paradox without inferring, from the negation of a complex truth condition, the negation of one of its parts. We can argue directly that its being false entails the negation of its being false, and so entails its being true."

Ṭūsī then prepares a stage for his own solution of the Liar paradox, writing that:

If a declarative sentence, by its nature, can declare-something-about anything, then it is possible that it itself can declare-something-about another declarative sentence.

He does not see a reason that could prevent a declarative sentence to declare something about another declarative sentence.

With an example of two declarative sentences, (D1) "It is false" and (D2) "Zayd is sitting", Ṭūsī explains how one declarative sentence (D1) can declare another declarative sentence (D2) to be false: "It is false that Zayd is sitting". There is no paradox in the above two declarative sentences because they have different subjects. To generate a paradox a declarative sentence must declare something about itself. If (D1) falsely declares itself to be not (D1) then this false declaration referencing to itself as being "false" creates a paradox.

Ṭūsī writes:

Moreover, if the first declarative sentence declares itself to be false, then [both] its being true, insofar as it is a declarative sentence, and its being false, insofar as it is that-about-which-something-is-declared, are concomitant. Thus, the following paradox can be generated: The first declarative sentence, which is a declaration (khabar) about itself, namely that it is false, is either false or true. If it is true, then it must be false, because it declares itself to be false. If it is false, then it must be true, because if it is said falsely, then it will become true, which is absurd.

The above conclusions are very important to the history of Liar Paradox. Alwishah and Sanson point out: "It is hard to overemphasize how remarkable this passage is. The contemporary reader will be familiar with the idea that the Liar Paradox is a paradox of selfreference. But Ṭūsī is, as far as we know, the first person to express this idea. This passage has no precedent in any tradition. Ṭūsī has performed three remarkable feats in short order. First, his Liar Sentence is singular: its subject is itself, and it declares itself to be false. Gone, then, is the choice between universal or particular Liar Sentence, and the associated problem of adding further assumptions to generate a genuine paradox. Second, he has characterized the paradox as one of self-reference. Third, he has identified a key assumption that might be responsible for generating the entire problem: the assumption that a declarative sentence, by its nature, can declare-something-about anything."

Recognizing that, if a declarative sentence that declares itself being false, is false, this does not necessitate it being true. Ṭūsī says that it would be absurd to say that this declarative sentence is true only because it is not false. Ṭūsī writes:

. . . its being false, insofar as it is a declarative sentence, does not necessitate its being true. Instead, its being false necessitates the denial of its being false, insofar as it is that-about-which-something-is-declared, and [necessitates] its being false, insofar as it is a declarative sentence. Hence, we should not concede that, in this way, the denial of its being false necessitates its being true.

Ṭūsī then interprets the definitions of "true" and "false", in an attempt to prove that those definitions should not be taken into consideration when dealing with a declarative sentence that declares itself, as its own subject, to be false.

Al-Baghdādī's definition of "truth" and "falsity" says that: "truth is an agreement with the subject, and falsity is the opposite of that". Ṭūsī argues that this definition cannot be applied to a declarative sentence that declares its own subject to be false because then there are at least two opposite parts that are in disagreement with each other. The same subject cannot be in disagreement with itself. Therefore, a self–referenced declarative sentence that declares itself to be false is neither false nor true, and truth/falsity definitions are not applicable to those sentences.

the result of a judgment that applies truth and falsity to something to which they in no way apply, and to apply them in any way is the misuse of a predicate.

Ṭūsī stopped short from offering a solution for the Liar sentences discussed by Āmidī "All that I say at this moment is false". This sentence presents a different case scenario because it can be interpreted as declaring something about itself, and something about another sentence. The solution for this paradox is absent from Ṭūsī's papers.

== Bibliography ==
- Alwishah, Ahmed; Sanson, David (2009), "The Early Arabic Liar:The Liar Paradox in the Islamic World from the Mid-Ninth to the Mid-Thirteenth Centuries CE" (PDF), Vivarium, 47 (1), Leiden: Brill: 97–127, doi:10.1163/156853408X345909, ISSN 0042-7543, archived from the original (PDF) on August 16, 2011
- Nasr, Seyyed Hossein (2006), Islamic Philosophy from Its Origin to the Present: Philosophy in the Land of Prophecy, Albany: SUNY Press, p. 380, ISBN 0-7914-6799-6
- Ṭūsī, Naṣīr al-Dīn Muḥammad ibn Muḥammad; Badakchani, S. J. (2005), Paradise of Submission: A Medieval Treatise on Ismaili Thought, Ismaili Texts and Translations, vol. 5, London: I.B. Tauris in association with Institute of Ismaili Studies, p. 300, ISBN 1-86064-436-8
