= Symbolic Systems Program =

Interdisciplinary program at Stanford University

The Symbolic Systems Program, colloquially abbreviated as SymSys, is a unique degree program at Stanford University for undergraduates and graduate students. It is an interdisciplinary degree encompassing the following:

- Computer science
- Linguistics
- Mathematics
- Philosophy
- Psychology
- Statistics

It is separate from Cognitive Science in that it is more expansive in scope. On March 7, 1986, the degree program was approved by the Stanford University Faculty Senate.

== Applications of linguistics ==
In the Linguistics Society of America report Linguistics in the Study of Information and Intelligence, Tom Wasow, founder and former director of the program, states in his report that the program is a program of which:

Linguistics plays a central role in the program because, as the systematic study of human language, it can contribute greatly to the development of a general theory about how information is conveyed through symbols. The field of linguistics also deals with an exceptional range of phenomena, and is intellectually and practically accessible to an undergraduate student, making it an especially suitable vehicle for teaching undergraduates how to evaluate theories.

The report continues with the following idea in its introduction: A child answers the phone and is instructed to hand the telephone to an adult. The report then presents with the need for an interdisciplinary approach for creating computer technology to do the same actions as the child would do when answering the phone.

== Notable graduates from program ==
- Reid Hoffman, the founder of LinkedIn, who graduated on 1990 with a Bachelor of Science degree in symbolic systems and cognitive science.
- Marissa Mayer, the CEO of Yahoo from 2012 to 2017, who graduated in 1997 with BS in symbolic systems.
- Mike Krieger, the co-founder and former CTO of Instagram, who graduated in 2008 with a Bachelor of Science in the SymSys program. Krieger, in the same year that he was to be awarded his bachelor's degree, won the Barwise Award for Distinguished Contribution to Symbolic Systems.
- Scott Forstall, was the software development team leader for the original iPhone at Apple Inc. as well as was a Broadway producer.
- Matt Flannery, the founder of the microlending organization Kiva.
- James Rucker, the co-founder of Color of Change.
- Srinija Srinivasan, the former editor-in-chief of Yahoo!, the co-founder of Loove (a music venture), and vice chair of Stanford University's board of trustees and a board member of the On Being Project.
- Tania Lombrozo, the director of the Concepts and Cognition Lab and Professor of Psychology at Princeton University and was formerly professor of psychology at UC Berkeley.
- Tony Tulathimutte, award-winning author and lead instructor at the creative writing workshop CRIT

== Barwise Award for Distinguished Contributions to Symbolic Systems ==
Inaugurated in 2001, the K. Jon Barwise Award for Distinguished Contributions to the Symbolic Systems Program was created in honor of the late Kenneth Jon Barwise, Professor in the Department of Philosophy, who served as the first faculty director of Symbolic Systems and a member of the program's founding committee.

== The Symbolic Systems Distinguished Teaching Award ==
Inaugurated in 2021, the award recognizes the contributions to the teaching of Symbolic Systems. With support from the School of Humanities and Sciences, the award recipients each receive a certificate and a monetary award.
