= Language, Truth, and Logic =

1936 book by A. J. Ayer

Language, Truth and Logic
- Cover of the first edition
- Author: A. J. Ayer
- Language: English
- Subject: Meaning
- Published: 1936
- Publication place: United Kingdom
- Media type: Print (Hardcover and Paperback)
- Pages: 206 (1990 Penguin edition)
- ISBN: 0-14-013659-2

Language, Truth and Logic is a 1936 book about meaning by the philosopher Alfred Jules Ayer, in which the author defines, explains, and argues for the verification principle of logical positivism, sometimes referred to as the criterion of significance or criterion of meaning. Ayer explains how the principle of verifiability may be applied to the problems of philosophy. Language, Truth and Logic brought some of the ideas of the Vienna Circle and the logical empiricists to the attention of the English-speaking world.

== Historical background ==
According to Ayer's autobiographical book, Part of My Life, it was work he started in the summer and autumn of 1933 that eventually led to Language, Truth and Logic, specifically Demonstration of the Impossibility of Metaphysics—later published in Mind under the editorship of G.E. Moore. The title of the book was taken ("To some extent plagiarized" according to Ayer) from Friedrich Waismann's Logik, Sprache, Philosophie.

== Criterion of meaning ==
According to Ayer, analytic statements are tautologies. A tautology is a statement that is necessarily true, true by definition, and true under any conditions. A tautology is a repetition of the meaning of a statement, using different words or symbols. According to Ayer, the statements of logic and mathematics are tautologies. Tautologies are true by definition, and thus their validity does not depend on empirical testing.

Synthetic statements, or empirical propositions, assert or deny something about the real world. The validity of synthetic statements is not established merely by the definition of the words or symbols they contain. According to Ayer, if a statement expresses an empirical proposition, then the validity of the proposition is established by its empirical verifiability.

Propositions are statements that have conditions under which they can be verified. By the verification principle, meaningful statements have conditions under which their validity can be affirmed or denied.

Statements that are not meaningful cannot be expressed as propositions. Every verifiable proposition is meaningful, although it may be either true or false. Every proposition asserts or denies something, and thus is either true or false.

== Types of verification ==
Ayer distinguishes between ‘strong’ and ‘weak’ verification, noting that there is a limit to how conclusively a proposition can be verified. ‘Strong’ (fully conclusive) verification is not possible for any empirical proposition, because the validity of any proposition always depends upon further experience. ‘Weak’ (probable) verification, on the other hand, is possible for any empirical proposition.

Ayer also distinguishes between practical and theoretical verifiability. Propositions for which we do not have a practical means of verification may still be meaningful if we can verify them in principle.

Literal meaning must also be distinguished from factual meaning. Literal meaning is an attribute of statements that are either analytic or empirically verifiable. Factual meaning is an attribute of statements that are meaningful without being analytic. Thus, statements that have factual meaning say something about the real world.

Ayer agrees with Hume that there are two main classes of propositions: those that concern 'relations of ideas,' and those that concern 'matters of fact.' Propositions about 'relations of ideas' include the a priori propositions of logic and mathematics. Propositions about 'matters of fact,' on the other hand, make assertions about the empirical world.

Ayer argues that philosophic propositions are analytic, and that they are concerned with 'relations of ideas.' The task of philosophy is to clarify the logical relationships of empirical propositions. If the meaning of propositions is defined by verifiability, then philosophy cannot provide speculative truths about metaphysical statements that cannot be empirically verified.

== Metaphysics attacked ==
Ayer rejects the metaphysical thesis that philosophy can give us knowledge of a transcendent reality. He dismisses metaphysical arguments, calling them nonsense, and saying that they cannot be empirically verified. He argues that metaphysical statements have no literal meaning, and that they cannot be subjected to criteria of truth or falsehood.

A significant consequence of abandoning metaphysics as a concern of philosophy is a rejection of the view that the function of philosophy is to propose basic principles of meaning and to construct a deductive system by offering the consequences of these principles of meaning as a complete picture of reality. But this is, some may argue, what Ayer does, in presenting the principle of verifiability as a criterion of meaningfulness for any empirical proposition.

According to Ayer, no proposition concerning "matters of fact" can ever be shown to be necessarily true, because there is always a possibility that it may be refuted by further empirical testing. Logical certainty is possible only for analytic observations, which are tautologies, and not for empirical observations concerning "matters of fact."

Ayer explains that his radical empiricism is opposed to rationalism. Rationalism asserts that there are truths about the world that can be known by a priori reasoning, or independently of experience. According to the principle of verifiability, propositions about 'matters of fact' can be meaningful only if they are capable of being empirically verified.

Ayer agrees with, and elaborates on, Kant's explanation of the distinction between analytic and synthetic judgments. According to Ayer, a proposition is analytic if its validity depends only on the definitions of the symbols it contains. A proposition is synthetic if its validity is determined by the facts of experience.

Analytic observations give us new knowledge, because they reveal unsuspected implications of our statements and beliefs. But analytic observations do not give us new knowledge of matters of fact, because they only tell us what is already known.

== Truth as validation ==
Ayer defines truth as the criterion by which empirical propositions are validated. To say that a proposition is true is simply to assert it, and to say that a proposition is false is simply to assert a contradictory proposition. Thus, truth and falsehood are simply signs of assertion or denial of empirically verifiable propositions.

In the same manner, assertions of value have meaning only insofar as they are verifiable. If an ethical or aesthetic judgment cannot be subjected to empirical testing, then it is meaningless. An empirical test may be practical or theoretical.

== Value judgments ==
For Ayer, ethical or aesthetic judgments are subjective rather than objective, and cannot be demonstrated to be true or false. Ethical or aesthetic judgments express feelings, not propositions, and have no objective validity. Value-judgments are not analytic, and are not verifiable as 'matters of fact.'

According to Ayer when we argue about whether a value-judgment is right or wrong, we are really arguing about the empirical facts on which a value-judgment is based, or about the logical interpretation of empirical facts. We cannot argue about something that cannot be expressed as a proposition. We can only argue about something that can be analytically or empirically verified.

For Ayer, metaphysical statements, such as statements about transcendent reality, have no objective validity, and therefore are meaningless. Examples of this lack of meaning include statements about the existence or nonexistence of God. According to Ayer, such statements can be neither proven nor disproven, and cannot be validated or invalidated by empirical testing.

== New take on philosophy ==
Ayer's logical empiricism makes an important contribution to philosophy in that it provides a method of putting an end to otherwise irresolvable philosophical disputes. In Ayer's logical empiricism, philosophy is no longer seen as a metaphysical concern, it is not a search for first principles nor an attempt to provide speculative truths about the nature of ultimate reality. Instead, philosophy is seen as an activity of defining and clarifying the logical relationships of empirical propositions. In considering how to distinguish between a conscious man and an unconscious machine, Ayer also anticipates the development in 1950 of the Turing test to test a machine's capability to demonstrate intelligence (consciousness).

The principle of verifiability, however, may become a means to arbitrarily reject any abstract or transcendent concept, such as “truth,” “justice,” or "virtue." Such concepts are seen as having no literal meaning. Thus, Ayer's viewpoint may become a radical scepticism. Ethics, aesthetics, and religion are all viewed as meaningless, as having no literal meaning. Ethical concepts are seen merely as expressions of feeling. Ethical or aesthetic concepts are seen as having no factual content, and therefore cannot be accepted as valid or invalid.

Ayer is careful to explain that the verification principle is a definition of meaning, and that it is not an empirical proposition. He admits that there are other possible definitions of meaning.

The most frequently expressed reservation about the principle is whether it is itself verifiable; this was addressed in the fictional dialogue "Logical Positivism: a discussion". Ayer believed that it could be derived analytically from usual definitions of words like "understanding". He admitted that one could then ask for verification of that definition and then carry on into an infinite regress. Ayer considered the latter option to be simply not worth consideration, although philosophers like Donald Davidson and Richard Rorty have since used it to undermine the concrete view of language found in works like Language, Truth and Logic.

== Ayer's later rejection of logical positivism ==
Logical positivism was the philosophical flavour of the day in the 1920s and 1930s, and it was indeed popularized by Ayer in his book Language, Truth and Logic. However, Ayer himself later rejected much of his own work. Fifty years after he wrote his book, he said: "Logical Positivism died a long time ago. I don’t think much of Language, Truth and Logic is true. I think it is full of mistakes".

== Release details ==
By 2002, the book had been printed in twelve editions. These included:

- 1936, London: Victor Gollancz Ltd, LCCN 36-18286, 254 pages
- 1946, London: Victor Gollancz Ltd, LCCN 46-8544, 160 pages
- 1952, New York City: Dover Publications, LCCN 52-860, 160 pages
- 1971, Harmondsworth: Penguin Books, ISBN 0-14-021200-0, 208 pages

== See also ==
- Language, Proof and Logic
