= Klayman =

Klayman is a British surname, indicating one's ancestors were involved into Clay mining or construction formerly.

Notable people with the name Klayman include:

- Larry Klayman (born 1951), US-American lawyer and former U.S. Justice Department prosecutor.

== See also ==
- Klayman v. Obama
- Clayman (surname)
- Clay Mann
