= State of affairs (philosophy) =

Philosophical concept

In philosophy, a state of affairs (German: Sachverhalt), also known as a situation, is a way the actual world must be in order to make some given proposition about the actual world true; in other words, a state of affairs is a truth-maker, whereas a proposition is a truth-bearer. Whereas states of affairs either obtain or fail-to-obtain, propositions are either true or false. Some philosophers understand the term "states of affairs" in a more restricted sense as a synonym for "fact". In this sense, there are no states of affairs that do not obtain.

The early Ludwig Wittgenstein and David Malet Armstrong are well known for their defence of a factualism, a position according to which the world is a world of facts and not a world of things.

== Overview ==
States of affairs are complex entities: they are built up from or constituted by other entities. Atomic states of affairs are constituted by one particular and one property exemplified by this particular. For example, the state of affairs that Socrates is wise is constituted by the particular "Socrates" and the property "wise". Relational states of affairs involve several particulars and a relation connecting them. States of affairs that obtain are also referred to as facts. It is controversial which ontological status should be ascribed to states of affairs that do not obtain. States of affairs have been prominent in 20th-century ontology as various theories were proposed to describe the world as composed of states of affairs.

In a sense of "state of affairs" favored by Ernest Sosa, states of affairs are situational conditions. In fact, in the Cambridge Dictionary of Philosophy, Sosa defines a condition to be a state of affairs, "way things are" or situation—most commonly referred to by a nominalization of a sentence. The expression "Snow's being white", which refers to the condition snow's being white, is a nominalization of the sentence "Snow is white". The truth of the proposition that "snow is white" is a nominalization of the sentence "the proposition that snow is white is true". Snow's being white is a necessary and sufficient condition for the truth of the proposition that snow is white. Conditions in this sense may be called situational.

Usually, necessity and sufficiency relate conditions of the same kind. Being an animal is a necessary attributive condition for being a dog. Fido's being an animal is a necessary situational condition for Fido's being a dog.

== See also ==
- Adolf Reinach
- Carl Stumpf
- Situation theory
- Tractatus Logico-Philosophicus
- Vacuous truth
