= John Etchemendy =

American philosopher

John W. Etchemendy
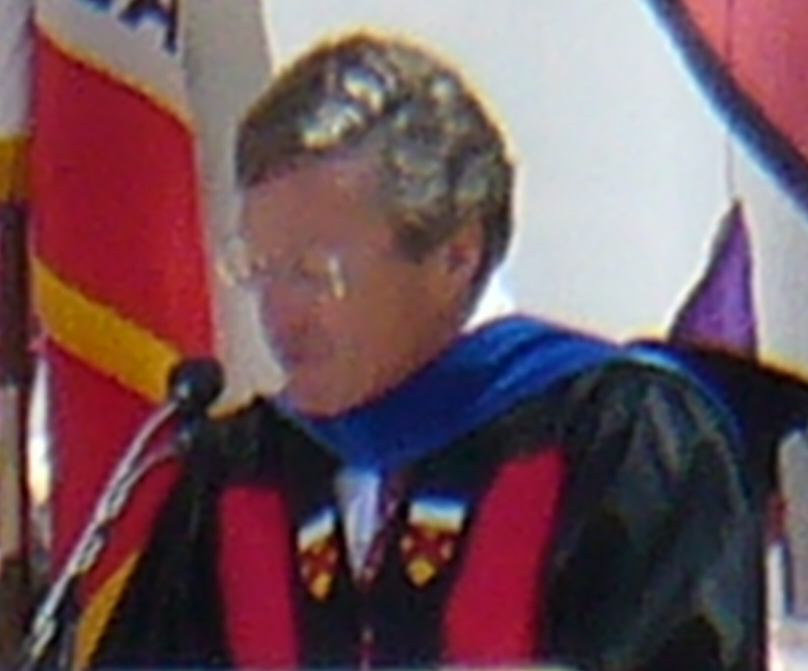
- Born: 1952 (age 73–74); Reno, Nevada, U.S.

Education
- Education: University of Nevada, Reno (BA, MA); Stanford University (PhD)
- Doctoral advisor: John Perry

Philosophical work
- Era: Contemporary philosophy
- Region: Western philosophy
- School: Analytic philosophy
- Institutions: Stanford University
- Doctoral students: Sun-Joo Shin
- Main interests: Logic, philosophy of language

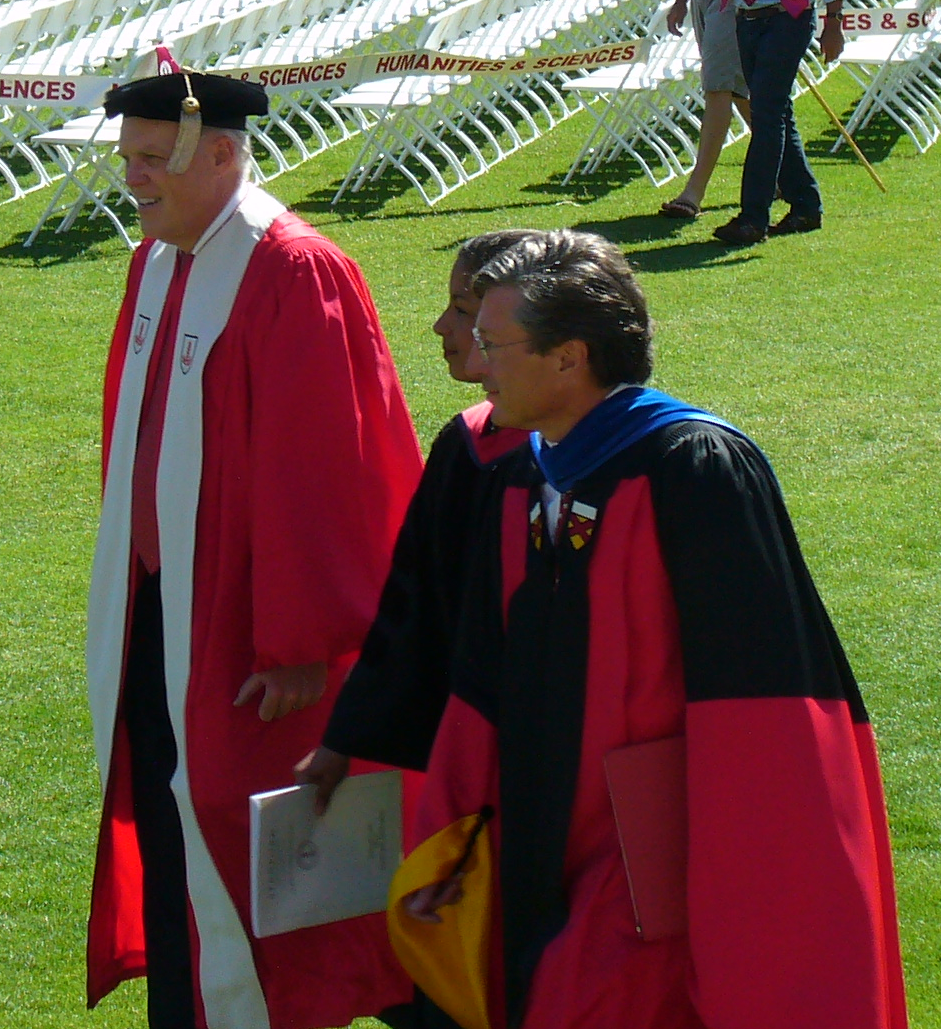
Left to right: John L. Hennessy, Susan Rice, and John Etchemendy, June 2010

John William Etchemendy (born 1952) is an American logician and philosopher who served as Stanford University's twelfth Provost. He succeeded John L. Hennessy to the post on September 1, 2000 and stepped down on January 31, 2017.

== Education and career ==
John Etchemendy received his bachelor's and master's degrees at the University of Nevada, Reno, before earning his PhD in philosophy at Stanford in 1982.

He has been a faculty member in Stanford's Department of Philosophy since 1983, prior to which he was a faculty member in the Philosophy Department at Princeton University. He is also a faculty member of Stanford's Symbolic Systems Program and a senior researcher at the Center for the Study of Language and Information at Stanford.

At Stanford, Etchemendy served as director of the Center for the Study of Language and Information from 1990 to 1993, senior associate dean in the School of Humanities and Sciences from 1993 to 1997, and chair of the Department of Philosophy from 1998 to 2000.

He is a member of the American Philosophical Association, on the editorial boards of Synthese and Philosophia Mathematica, and a former editor of the Journal of Symbolic Logic. His wife is the writer Nancy Etchemendy and they have one son Max Etchemendy.

== Philosophical work ==
Etchemendy's research interests include logic, semantics and the philosophy of language. He has challenged orthodox views on the central notions of truth, logical consequence and logical truth. His most well-known book, The Concept of Logical Consequence (1990, 1999), criticizes Alfred Tarski's widely accepted analysis of logical consequence. The Liar: An essay on truth and circularity (1987, 1992), co-authored with the late Jon Barwise, develops a formal account of the liar paradox modelled using a version of set theory incorporating the so-called Anti-Foundation Axiom.

Etchemendy's recent work has focused on the role of diagrams and other nonlinguistic forms of representation in reasoning. His latest book, written with Jon Barwise and Dave Barker-Plummer, is Language, Proof and Logic (2000, 2006), a popular introductory logic textbook. He has also developed numerous pieces of instructional software, including Turing's World, Tarski's World, Fitch, and Hyperproof, software that allows computers to support the reasoning process.

Academic offices
Preceded by John L. Hennessy	Provost of Stanford University; 2000–2017	Succeeded by Persis Drell
