= John Perry (philosopher) =

American philosopher

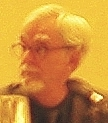
- Born: John Richard Perry; January 16, 1943 (age 83); Lincoln, Nebraska, U.S.

Education
- Education: Doane College (BA, 1964); Cornell University (PhD, 1968)
- Doctoral advisor: Keith Donnellan
- Other advisors: Max Black; Sydney Shoemaker

Philosophical work
- Era: 20th-century philosophy
- Region: Western philosophy
- School: Analytic philosophy
- Institutions: University of California, Los Angeles; Stanford University; University of California, Riverside
- Doctoral students: John Etchemendy; Thomas Hofweber
- Main interests: Philosophy of language; philosophy of mind; metaphysics
- Notable ideas: Situation semantics Slingshot argument

John Richard Perry (born January 16, 1943) is an American philosopher who is professor emeritus at Stanford University and the University of California, Riverside. He has made significant contributions to philosophy in the fields of philosophy of language, metaphysics, and philosophy of mind. He is known primarily for his work on situation semantics (together with Jon Barwise), reflexivity, indexicality, personal identity, and self-knowledge.

== Life and career ==
John Perry was born in Lincoln, Nebraska on January 16, 1943. He received his B.A. in philosophy from Doane College in 1964, and his Ph.D. in philosophy from Cornell University in 1968 with a thesis entitled Identity. In the acknowledgements of his thesis, he thanked professors Keith Donnellan, Max Black, and Sydney Shoemaker for their support.

He taught philosophy at the University of California, Los Angeles (1968–1974), before joining the faculty at Stanford University (1974–2008) where he is Henry Waldgrave Professor of Philosophy Emeritus. He then taught at the University of California, Riverside (2008–2014) where he is now Distinguished Professor of Philosophy Emeritus.

He was awarded the Jean Nicod Prize in 1999. He is a member of the American Academy of Arts and Sciences and the Norwegian Academy of Science and Letters.

He was co-host of Philosophy Talk, a nationally syndicated radio program which he co-founded with Ken Taylor in 2004. He was also part of the Center for the Study of Language and Information (CSLI)—an independent research center founded in 1983.

== Philosophical work ==
Perry has made contributions to many areas of philosophy, including logic, philosophy of language, metaphysics, and philosophy of mind.

Perry's 1978 book A Dialogue on Personal Identity and Immortality deals with standard problems in the theory of personal identity in the form of a dialogue between a mortally wounded university professor, Gretchen Weirob, and her two friends, Sam Miller and Dave Cohen. The views represented include those of Bernard Williams, John Locke, and Derek Parfit. The format of associating different philosophical positions with different characters in a dialogue recalls David Hume's Dialogues Concerning Natural Religion.

In logic, Perry and Jon Barwise are known for their discussion of the slingshot argument, especially in their 1981 article "Semantic Innocence and Uncompromising Situations".

In his 2001 book Knowledge, Possibility and Consciousness, Perry argues for what he calls "antecedent physicalism", according to which physicalism is antecedently taken to be a plausible and reasonable position, provided that there are no better rival theories. Thus, Perry defends a version of type physicalism against three major anti-physicalist arguments: the zombie argument, the knowledge argument, and the modal argument.

Perry also produces non-technical work that reaches a wider audience, such as his humorous 1996 online essay entitled "Structured Procrastination". It states that "[t]o be a high achiever, always work on something important, using it as a way to avoid doing something that's even more important". Perry was awarded an Ig Nobel Prize in Literature for this essay in 2011.

=== "The Problem of the Essential Indexical" ===
In 1979, Perry published "The Problem of the Essential Indexical" in which he combined his work on philosophy of language and philosophy of mind. Essential indexicals (I, here, and now) are parts of language that cannot be paraphrased away. They are seen as locating beliefs and are essential to understanding the speaker's belief. Perry presents a now-famous example to illustrate his point:

"I once followed a trail of sugar on a supermarket floor, pushing my cart down the aisle on one side of a tall counter and back the aisle on the other, seeking the shopper with the torn sack to tell him he was making a mess. With each trip around the counter, the trail became thicker. But I seemed unable to catch up. Finally it dawned on me. I was the shopper I was trying to catch."

In this example, the pronoun "I" is essentially indexical because it allowed Perry to realize that it was he himself making the mess. This realization caused him to change his behavior. Essential indexicals create the impetus for action. They cannot be paraphrased away while retaining their immediacy. If Perry were to say "Perry realized that Perry was making a mess", it would still not be essentially indexical because Perry would still have to understand that he himself is Perry. Without that extra step, there would be no reason for him to change his action. "I" is the only essential indexical in that situation.

== Selected bibliography ==
=== Books ===
- (1978) A Dialogue on Personal Identity and Immortality. Indianapolis: Hackett Publishing Company.
- (1983) Situations and Attitudes (with Jon Barwise). Cambridge, Massachusetts: Bradford Books/MIT Press. (Reprinted with a new introduction by CSLI Publications, 1999.)
- (1993) The Problem of the Essential Indexical and Other Essays. New York: Oxford University Press. (Enlarged edition, Stanford: CSLI Publications, 2000.)
- (1999) Dialogue on Good, Evil and the Existence of God. Cambridge/Indianapolis: Hackett Publishing Company.
- (2001) Knowledge, Possibility and Consciousness. Cambridge, Massachusetts.: Bradford-MIT.
- (2001) Reference and Reflexivity. Stanford: CSLI Publications.
- (2002) Identity, Personal Identity and the Self, Selected Essays. Indianapolis: Hackett Publishing.
- (2011) Critical Pragmatics (with Kepa Korta). Cambridge: Cambridge University Press.
- (2012) The Art of Procrastination: A Guide to Effective Dawdling, Lollygagging and Postponing
- (2018) Dialogue on Consciousness: Minds, Brains, and Zombies, Hackett Publishing, 2018.
- (2019) Frege's Detour. Oxford: Oxford University Press.
- (2019) Studies in Language and Information. CSLI Publications.
- (2020) Revisiting the Essential Indexical. CSLI Publications.

=== Articles ===
- (1972) "Can The Self Divide?". Journal of Philosophy, LXIX, no. 16, pp. 463 – 88.
- (1977) "Frege on Demonstratives". The Philosophical Review, Vol. 86, No. 4., pp. 474–497.
- (1979) "The Problem of the Essential Indexical". Noûs 13, no. 1: 3 – 21.
- (1980) "A Problem about Continued Belief". Pacific Philosophical Quarterly 61, no. 4, pp. 317 – 22.
- (1980) "Belief and Acceptance". Midwest Studies in Philosophy V, pp. 533 – 42.
- (1981) "Semantic Innocence and Uncompromising Situations" (with Jon Barwise). Midwest Studies in Philosophy VI, pp. 387 – 403.
- (1981) "Situations and Attitudes" (with Jon Barwise). Journal of Philosophy LXXVII, no. 1, pp. 668 – 91.
- (1986) "From Worlds to Situations". Journal of Philosophical Logic 15, pp. 83 – 107.
- (1986) "Thought Without Representation". Supplementary Proceedings of the Aristotelian Society, vol. 60, pp. 263 – 83.
- (1988) "Cognitive Significance and New Theories of Reference". Noûs 2, no. 2, pp. 1 – 18.
- (1989) "The Prince and the Phonebooth: Reporting Puzzling Beliefs" (with Mark Crimmins). Journal of Philosophy, pp. 685 – 711.
- (1993) "Executions, Motivations and Accomplishments" (with David Israel and Syun Tutiya). The Philosophical Review, pp. 515 – 40.
- (1994) "Fodor and Lepore on Holism". Philosophical Studies, 73, pp. 123–138.

== See also ==
- List of Jean Nicod Prize laureates
