= Situation semantics =

Concept in situation theory

Situation semantics is a framework in formal semantics and situation theory in which the meanings of linguistic expressions are evaluated with respect to situations—partial, concrete parts or aspects of the world—rather than complete possible worlds. It was developed in the late 1970s and early 1980s by Jon Barwise and John Perry as an alternative to extensional model theory and possible-worlds semantics, with a particular focus on perception reports, attitude reports and other context-dependent constructions in natural language.

Situation semantics is underpinned by situation theory, a general mathematical theory of information developed by Barwise, Perry, Keith Devlin and others, which introduces formal objects such as infons (units of information), constraints and types to model how information is carried and flows between situations.

In contemporary formal semantics, situation-based approaches include both the original Barwise–Perry programme and a more widely adopted family of theories (associated especially with Angelika Kratzer) that treat situations as parts of possible worlds and use situation variables in otherwise orthodox possible-worlds semantics.

== History ==
=== Origins in Barwise and Perry ===
Situations entered formal semantics through Barwise's paper "Scenes and Other Situations" (1981), which analysed naked infinitive perception reports such as Beryl saw Meryl feed the animals in terms of an actually perceived situation that supports the embedded clause, rather than in terms of propositions alone. Related papers by Barwise and Perry developed a broadly similar approach to belief reports and other problematic constructions.

The book Situations and Attitudes (1983) provided the first systematic statement of situation semantics. It proposed that linguistic meaning should be understood in terms of relations between three kinds of situations: a discourse situation (in which an utterance is produced), a resource or connective situation (representing background information, constraints and shared context), and a described situation (the situation talked about). The framework was designed to capture how speakers use information available in limited parts of the world to talk about other parts, and to account for so-called "semantic universals" such as the external, information-conveying role of language.

=== From situation semantics to situation theory ===
Early formulations of situation semantics faced foundational problems when cast in standard well-founded set theory, especially when modelling information flow and self-referential structures. Building on Peter Aczel's work in non-well-founded set theory, Barwise and colleagues developed situation theory as a general theory of information with a rich ontology of situations, infons, types and constraints, and used it to reformulate the semantic programme.

Keith Devlin's work in the late 1980s and early 1990s further systematised situation theory, introducing infons as formal items of information and emphasising the distinction between information, its content and its various representations. Situation theory subsequently developed into a general interdisciplinary framework for modelling information in logic, linguistics, philosophy of information and computer science.

=== Criticism and later developments ===
Barwise and Perry's original proposals for perception reports were challenged by, among others, James Higginbotham, who argued for an extensional alternative based on Davidsonian event semantics. More generally, critics observed that many of the empirical motivations for situations could be addressed in frameworks that kept standard possible-worlds machinery while enriching it with events or additional parameters.

Although the specific Barwise–Perry framework lost much of its momentum in the early 1990s, a situation-based perspective remained influential. Kratzer and others developed a strand of situation semantics that treats situations as parts of possible worlds and uses them to model topic situations, domain restrictions and fine-grained content. According to Barbara Partee, such "possible-worlds-based" situation semantics has had more impact on mainstream formal semantics than the original information-theoretic programme of Barwise and Perry.

== Basic ideas ==
=== Situations ===
In situation semantics, situations are limited, concrete parts or aspects of the world that an agent can in principle perceive, keep track of and reason about. They are often described as "small worlds" containing individuals standing in relations and having properties at particular times and locations. Situations can include, for example, a particular episode of feeding animals, a traffic intersection at a given time, or a specific conversational exchange.

Unlike complete possible worlds, situations are incomplete: for many propositions p, neither p nor ¬p need be settled by a given situation. This partiality is central to the programme: language users typically have access only to limited parts of reality, yet they use information available in those parts to draw conclusions about other parts.

=== Infons and information content ===
Later formulations of situation theory and situation semantics introduce infons as abstract items of information. Intuitively, an infon corresponds to a simple state of affairs, such as an object having a property or a tuple of objects standing in a relation. A common notation represents infons as tuples of the form ⟨R, a_{1}, ..., a_{n}, p⟩, where R is an n-place relation, the a_{i} are objects, and p is a polarity indicating whether the information is positive or negative.

Given a suitable ontology of situations and infons, situation theory distinguishes several key relations:

- A situation s supports an infon σ when σ is part of the information that actually obtains in s (roughly, when the corresponding state of affairs holds in s).
- A situation carries an infon σ when, by general constraints, support for some infons in s guarantees σ, possibly about another situation.

On this view, information flow is governed by constraints—some nomic (laws of nature), some conventional (linguistic or social conventions), some logical or mathematical. These constraints explain how limited local information can yield knowledge about more remote or abstract aspects of the world.

=== Meaning as relations between situations ===
In the original Barwise–Perry framework, the meaning of an utterance is analysed as a relation between:

- the discourse situation in which the utterance is made;
- a resource' or connective situation encoding background information, conversational common ground and relevant constraints; and
- the described situation that the utterance is about.

For example, a direct perception report such as Beryl saw Meryl feed the animals is analysed as asserting the existence of a past situation s which Beryl saw and which supports the infon corresponding to Meryl feed the animals. The verb see is thus treated as taking a situation rather than a proposition as its primary semantic argument.

More generally, sentences impose conditions on situations, and complex expressions (such as definite descriptions, quantifier phrases or pronouns) may introduce or depend on situation variables. This allows the framework to model phenomena such as incomplete descriptions, shifting quantifier domains and context-sensitive anaphora.

=== Comparison with possible-worlds semantics ===
Situation semantics was explicitly conceived as an alternative to possible-worlds semantics. Both frameworks evaluate expressions relative to parameters beyond the actual world, but they differ in how those parameters are understood and used:

- In classical Montague-style semantics, sentences are typically assigned intensions—functions from possible worlds (and sometimes times) to truth values, and many analyses treat propositions as sets of worlds.
- In situation semantics, truth is evaluated relative to partial situations; propositions may be identified with sets of situations or with structured situation-like entities.

Even within possible-worlds semantics, however, it has become common to augment the evaluation point with additional coordinates, including times, locations and situations. Kratzer's work develops an approach in which situations are regarded as parts of worlds, with semantic composition often involving both a world and a "topic situation" parameter. From this perspective, situation semantics and possible-worlds semantics are less competing theories than different ways of organising the same ingredients.

== Variants and extensions ==
=== Barwise–Perry style situation semantics ===
The Barwise–Perry programme emphasised:

- an information-theoretic ontology of situations and infons;
- semantic universals such as the external role of language and the centrality of information flow; and
- a close integration of natural language semantics with general theories of information and cognition.

This version of situation semantics was applied to direct perception reports, de re belief reports, pronouns and demonstratives, and various kinds of context-dependent expressions. Much of this work is collected in the multi-volume series Situation Theory and Its Applications.

=== Situation theory as a general theory of information ===
As developed by Devlin, Seligman, Moss and others, situation theory abstracts away from specifically linguistic phenomena and offers a general account of information content, types, parameters and constraints. It provides basic types for individuals, locations, times, relations, situations, infons and other constructs, and uses type abstraction and constraint satisfaction to model information flow.

This abstract framework has been applied outside linguistics, including in knowledge representation, information retrieval and context-aware computing.

=== Kratzer-style situation semantics ===
A distinct line of work, associated particularly with Angelika Kratzer, builds situation-based semantics on top of possible-worlds semantics. On this approach:

- situations are mereological parts of worlds;
- evaluation points include both a world and a situation (often a "topic situation"); and
- situation variables are systematically used to capture contextual restrictions on quantification and predication.

This framework has been used to develop detailed analyses of, among other topics, implicit quantifier domain restrictions, so-called donkey pronouns, exhaustive interpretations, and the integration of situation semantics with Davidsonian event semantics. It has also inspired extensive work on situation variables in determiner phrases and other constituents.

=== Connections to truthmaker and alternative semantics ===
More recent work connects situation semantics to truthmaker semantics and alternative-based approaches. Some authors treat situations (or closely related entities such as "cases") as truthmakers or as elements in alternative sets used to capture focus and inquisitive content. In such frameworks, ideas from situation semantics contribute to debates about the ontology of facts, the structure of propositions and the semantics of modality and conditionals.

== Applications ==
=== Linguistics and HPSG ===
Situation semantics played a central role in early work on head-driven phrase structure grammar (HPSG). Pollard and Sag adopted a situation-based semantics for HPSG in order to integrate syntactic, semantic and pragmatic information in a single constraint-based formalism. Later HPSG work on interrogatives and dialogue, such as Ginzburg and Sag's Interrogative Investigations, also draws on situation-semantic ideas.

A survey of HPSG notes that the framework "started out with situation semantics (Barwise & Perry 1983)" before later adopting Minimal Recursion Semantics as a more underspecified semantic interface.

Beyond HPSG, situation semantics and situation variables are widely used in contemporary work on:

- domain restriction for quantifiers and definite descriptions;
- the interpretation of tense and aspect;
- attitude reports and propositional attitudes; and
- discourse relations and point of view.

=== Logic, philosophy of language and information ===
In philosophical logic and the philosophy of language, situation semantics has influenced debates about the nature of propositions, facts and information. Some authors treat situations or infons as candidates for fine-grained contents that can play the role of truthmakers, mental contents or objects of attitudes, in contrast to more coarse-grained sets of worlds.

Situation theory, in turn, has contributed to a family of logics and models for information flow, sometimes in combination with ideas from Fred Dretske's theory of information.

=== Computer science and AI ===
Situation-theoretic notions have been applied in computational linguistics, knowledge representation and context-aware systems. Examples include information-retrieval models based on situation theory and work on situation-aware services where detectable situations are manipulated as objects in formal systems.

== See also ==
- Situation theory
- Possible world semantics
- Montague grammar
- Formal semantics (linguistics)
- Head-driven phrase structure grammar
