= Michelle Clayman =

American businessman

Michelle R. Clayman is chief investment officer of New Amsterdam Partners, LLC, a firm she founded in 1986. New Amsterdam Partners offers large cap and mid cap investment strategies to institutional investors. Clayman sits on the Boards of the Society of Quantitative Analysts(of which she is a past President), and The Institute for Quantitative Research. She is a frequent commentator for CNBC, Bloomberg, and other financial media.

== Education ==
A graduate of Stanford University's Graduate School of Business, Clayman is the first woman to receive the School's Excellence in Leadership Award, in 2008.

== Philanthropy & Causes ==
Clayman is a strong supporter of women's causes, notably as the chair of the Michelle R. Clayman Institute for Gender Research at Stanford University. In 2010, the National Council for Research on Women awarded Clayman the "Making a Difference for Women Award" recognizing Clayman's leadership in supporting research on women. In 2018 she was appointed to Stanford University's board of trustees.

Clayman has been a Girl Scout troop leader for many years and as of 2022 is serving as chair of the board of directors of the Girl Scout Council of Greater New York.

As of 2015 she was on the board of Sustainable Health Enterprises (SHE). She is known as a role model for women in finance.

Clayman says she owes her education to her mother, who was evacuated from England to the United States during World War II and there received a college education. Her mother then ensured her children benefited in the same way. Clayman received a degree in Philosophy, Politics and Economics from Oxford University, England (MA Oxon).

Clayman's other volunteer activities include serving as a Director of Children of Bellevue, a charity providing services to children at New York's Bellevue Hospital. She is also a member of the Dean's Council at the Harvard Divinity School.

== Select publications ==
Clayman is published in investment management journals on topics mainly concentrating on portfolio construction and asset management. Some of the publications are listed below

=== Books ===
- Clayman, M.R., Fridson, M.S. and Troughton, G.H., 2012. Corporate Finance Workbook: A Practical Approach (Vol. 43). John Wiley & Sons.

=== Journal articles ===
- Clayman, M., 1987. In Search of Excellence: The Investor’s Viewpoint. Financial Analysts Journal, 43(3), pp. 54–63.
- Clayman, M., 1994. Excellence revisited. Financial Analysts Journal, 50(3), pp. 61–65.
