= Jon Barwise =

American mathematician, philosopher and logician (1942–2000)

Kenneth Jon Barwise (/ˈbɑːrwaɪz/; June 29, 1942 – March 5, 2000) was an American mathematician, philosopher, and logician. He is known for his contributions to mathematical logic and situation semantics. Together with Robin Cooper, he formulated the conservativity principle for natural-language determiners.

== Education and career ==
He was born in Independence, Missouri, to Kenneth T. and Evelyn Barwise.

A student of Solomon Feferman at Stanford University, Barwise began his research working in infinitary logic. After positions at Yale University and the University of Wisconsin, during which time his interests turned to natural language, he returned to Stanford in 1983 to direct the Center for the Study of Language and Information (CSLI). He began teaching at Indiana University in 1990. He was elected a Fellow of the American Academy of Arts and Sciences in 1999.

In his final year, Barwise was invited to give the 2000 Gödel Lecture; he died prior to the lecture.

== Philosophical and logical work ==
Barwise contended that, by being explicit about the context in which a proposition is made, the situation, many problems in the application of logic can be eliminated. He sought "to understand meaning and inference within a general theory of information, one that takes us outside the realm of sentences and relations between sentences of any language, natural or formal." In particular, he claimed that such an approach resolved the liar paradox. He made use of Peter Aczel's non-well-founded set theory in understanding "vicious circles" of reasoning.

Barwise, along with his former colleague at Stanford John Etchemendy, was the author of the popular logic textbook Language, Proof and Logic. The text is notable for including computer-aided homework problems, some of which provide visual representations of logical problems. During his time at Stanford, he was also the first director of the Symbolic Systems Program, an interdepartmental degree program focusing on the relationships between cognition, language, logic, and computation. The K. Jon Barwise Award for Distinguished Contributions to the Symbolic Systems Program has been given periodically since 2001. The Barwise Prize was established in 2002 by the American Philosophical Association, awarded for contributions to philosophy and computing.

== Selected publications ==
- Barwise, K. J. (1975). Admissible Sets and Structures: An Approach to Definability Theory. ISBN 0-387-07451-1.
- Barwise, K. J. & Perry, John (1983). Situations and Attitudes. ISBN 1-57586-193-3.
- Barwise, K. J. & Etchemendy, J. (1987). The Liar: An Essay in Truth and Circularity. ISBN 0-19-505944-1.
- Barwise, K. J. (1988). The Situation in Logic. ISBN 0-937073-32-6.
- Barwise, K. J. & Moss, L. (1996). Vicious Circles: On the Mathematics of Non-Wellfounded Phenomena. ISBN 1-57586-008-2.
- Barwise, K, J. & Seligman, J. (1997). Information Flow: the Logic of Distributed Systems. ISBN 0-521-58386-1.
- Barwise, K. J. & Etchemendy, J. (2002). Language, Proof and Logic. ISBN 1-57586-374-X.
- Barwise, K. J. (editor) (1977). Handbook of Mathematical Logic. ISBN 0-7204-2285-X.
- Barwise, J. & Feferman, S. (editors) (1985). Model-Theoretic Logics. ISBN 0-387-90936-2.

== See also ==
- Barwise Prize
- Barwise compactness theorem
- Slingshot argument
