= Peter Aczel =

British mathematician and logician

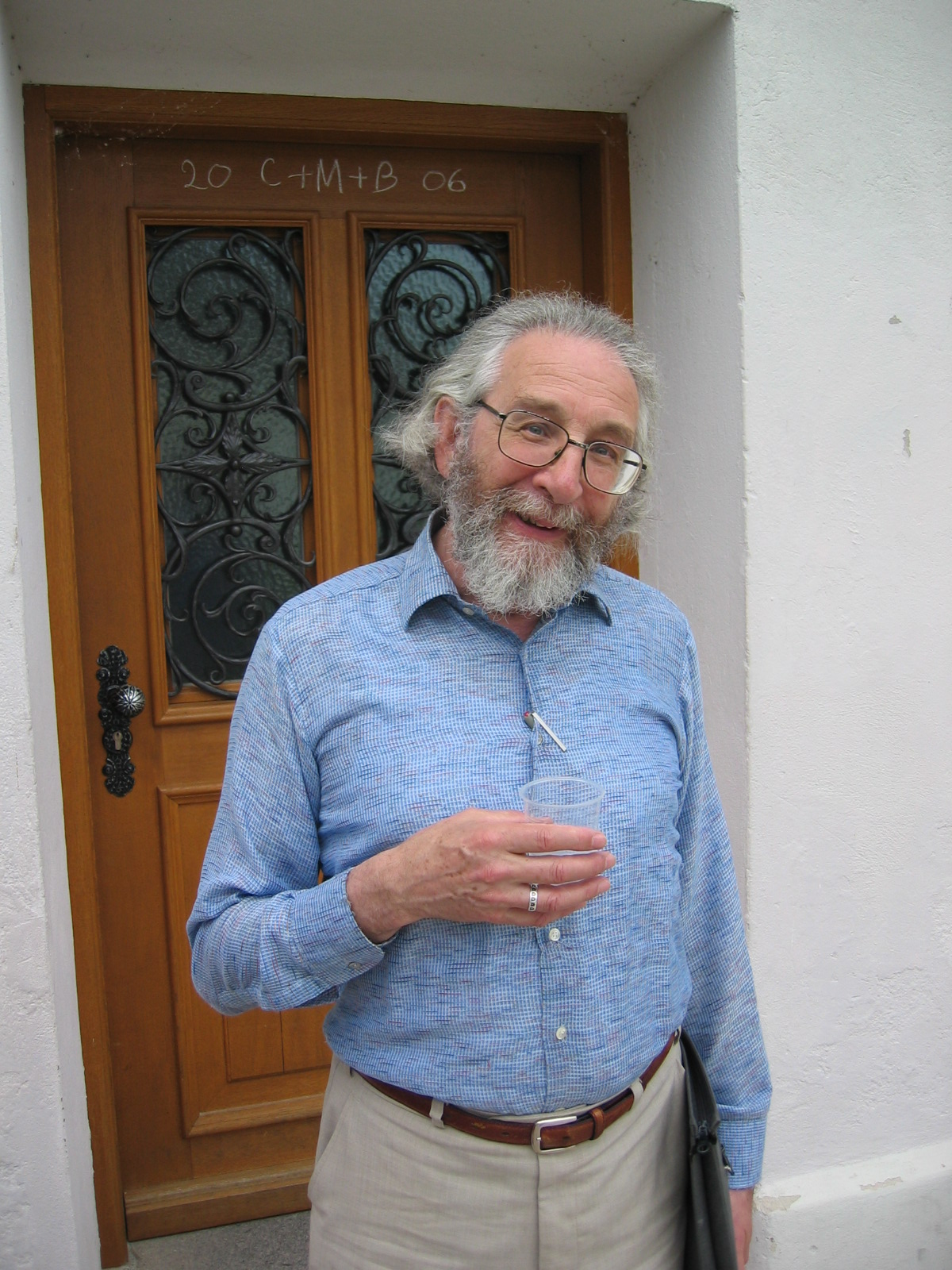
- Aczel in 2006
- Born: Peter Henry George Aczel; 31 October 1941
- Died: 1 August 2023 (aged 81)
- Education: University of Oxford
- Known for: Aczel's anti-foundation axiom Reflexive sets Constructive set theory (CZF)
- Scientific career
- Fields: Mathematical logic
- Workplaces: University of Oxford; University of Wisconsin–Madison; Rutgers University; University of Manchester; University of Oslo; Caltech; Utrecht University; Stanford University; Institute for Advanced Study; Indiana University Bloomington
- Thesis: Mathematical Problems in Logic (1967)
- Doctoral advisor: John Newsome Crossley
- Website: www.cs.man.ac.uk/~petera/

Peter Henry George Aczel (/ˈæksəl/; 31 October 1941 – 1 August 2023) was a British mathematician, logician and Emeritus joint Professor in the Department of Computer Science and the School of Mathematics at the University of Manchester. He is known for his work in non-well-founded set theory, constructive set theory, and Frege structures.

== Education ==
Aczel completed his Bachelor of Arts in Mathematics in 1963 followed by a DPhil at the University of Oxford in 1966 under the supervision of John Crossley.

== Career and research ==
After two years of visiting positions at the University of Wisconsin–Madison and Rutgers University, Aczel took a position at the University of Manchester. He has also held visiting positions at the University of Oslo, California Institute of Technology, Utrecht University, Stanford University, and Indiana University Bloomington. In the Spring of 2009, Aczel was a Residential Fellow at the Swedish Collegium for Advanced Study in Uppsala, Sweden. He was a visiting scholar at the Institute for Advanced Study in 2012.

Aczel was on the editorial board of the Notre Dame Journal of Formal Logic and the Cambridge Tracts in Theoretical Computer Science, having previously served on the editorial boards of the Journal of Symbolic Logic and the Annals of Pure and Applied Logic.

He died on 1 August 2023.
