= Meaning (philosophy) =

Sense or significance of an entity

Meaning is the sense or significance of something. It is what expressions, representations, or events convey, stand for, refer to, or make intelligible. Meaning is often understood as a relational concept that links an entity to what it signifies, such as the connection between the word dog and a four-legged mammal.

Philosophical inquiry is particularly interested in linguistic meaning: how words, sentences, and utterances acquire content, convey information about the world, and evoke emotions. It distinguishes between what an expression conventionally means and what a specific speaker intends to communicate, and between literal and figurative meaning. Central debates address the relation between sense and reference; aspects of meaning such as vagueness, ambiguity, and context-dependence; and how the meaning of a complex expression depends on the meanings of its parts. Philosophers also discuss non-linguistic meaning associated with gestures, pictures, actions, and natural signs, such as footprints. The meaning of life is another form of non-linguistic meaning concerned with the general significance of human life or existence as a whole.

Theories of meaning seek to identify the nature, sources, and functions of linguistic meaning. Reference-based theories hold that the meaning of an expression is what it stands for or the entity it denotes. Truth-conditional theories maintain that to understand a statement is to grasp what the world would be like if it were true. Mind-based theories explain meaning in terms of mental processes, such as ideas or communicative intentions. Use-based theories analyze the meaning of an expression in terms of the function it plays in human social behavior. There are also theories that focus on the role of inferences, verification, and responses to stimuli.

The study of meaning is central to philosophy of language and informs semiotics, logic, philosophy of mind, hermeneutics, aesthetics, ethics, and philosophy of religion. Philosophical inquiry into meaning originated in antiquity in ancient Greek, Indian, and Chinese thought.

== Definition ==
Meaning is the sense or significance of an entity, expressing what it conveys or stands for. It is a broad concept associated with signs and understanding, but its precise definition varies with domain and context. Philosophical inquiry often focuses on meaning in language, which concerns the sense of expressions, such as the entities to which words refer or the ideas that sentences convey. Meaning is also attributed to non-linguistic representations, such as pictures and maps that depict the world, and to mental states that represent or interpret reality. In another sense, meaning is discussed as an aspect of actions and other events, reflecting how they embody intentions, manifest values, fit into cultural narratives, or carry historical significance. In a broader sense, meaning can also apply to life or the world as a whole, asking whether a higher purpose governs the cosmic order and grants significance to human existence.

Philosophers typically treat meaning as a relational concept that connects an entity to something else. For example, the meaning of a sign, such as the word dog, connects the sign to what it stands for, such as a four-legged animal. This relational aspect may be analyzed in terms of intentionality as a way how a meaningful entity is about or directed at something else, for instance, by referring to an object, representing a situation, or conveying information about the world. Meaning is closely linked to understanding and communication and is typically regarded as a key element in grasping reality and expressing ideas about it.

The terms sense and significance are often used as synonyms of meaning but also carry distinct connotations depending on the context. A single entity can have several meanings, such as the word bank, which can signify a financial institution or the side of a river. Conversely, two distinct entities can share the same meaning, such as the words film and movie. Meaning contrasts with meaninglessness, in which an entity is unintelligible or lacks a coherent reference or purpose. The noun meaning was first formed in Middle English, with an early use in the Wycliffite Bible around 1384. The noun derives from the verb to mean, which has its roots in the Old English mǣnan and the Old Saxon mēnian ('to intend, to make known').

== Types ==
=== Linguistic and non-linguistic ===
Linguistic meaning concerns the sense of expressions formed according to a language, such as English or Japanese. Languages are typically spoken or written, but there are also sign languages based on gestures, like American Sign Language. Languages are complex sign systems to communicate ideas. They use semantic units, such as words, to construct more complex expressions, including sentences and longer texts. This process follows conventions, such as the rules of grammar. These are shared within a linguistic community, governing how expressions are formed and what meanings they have.

Non-linguistic meaning encompasses the significance conveyed outside of language. Many non-linguistic sign systems are used to communicate meaning, including traffic signals, gestures, facial expressions, maps, and emojis. Linguistic and non-linguistic meaning do not exclude each other and can overlap. For example, paralanguage comprises non-linguistic elements that shape the meaning of linguistic expressions or convey additional information. Articulation, rhythm, pitch, and loudness are paralinguistic elements in spoken language, while colors and fonts serve as paralinguistic markers in written communication.

Philosophical inquiry into meaning often centers on linguistic meaning. One reason is the idea that language is the most complex and general sign system, serving as a paradigm case that can also describe meanings expressed in other sign systems.

==== Word, sentence, and utterance ====
Word meaning concerns the semantic content of lexical units (top). Sentence meaning concerns the semantic content of a full sentence (middle). Utterance meaning concerns the semantic content of speech acts in concrete circumstances (bottom).

The study of linguistic meaning is often divided into word meaning, sentence meaning, and utterance meaning, studied by lexical semantics, phrasal semantics, and pragmatics, respectively. Word meaning concerns the semantic content of lexical units such as sleep, bird, and all. The meaning of many words is non-compositional: it cannot be derived from their parts, such as sounds or letters. Philosophers of language discuss different types of words and the meanings associated with each type. For example, one view identifies the meaning of a name, such as Cleopatra, with the entity it refers to, and the meaning of a verb, such as run, with the set of actions or events it applies to. Other philosophical discussions center on semantic features of words, like vagueness and ambiguity, and on lexical relations between words, such as synonyms with the same meaning and antonyms with opposed meanings.

Sentence meaning concerns the semantic content of a full sentence, understood as a well-formed string of words. A key aspect, in contrast to word meaning, is the role of compositionality: the meaning of a sentence is systematically influenced by the meanings of its parts and their mode of combination. Sentence meaning also varies by sentence type: declarative sentences make assertions, interrogative sentences ask questions, and imperative sentences issue commands, such as the contrast between "The window is closed.", "Is the window closed?" and "Close the window!". Philosophical analysis often focuses on the meaning of declarative sentences, regarding them as vehicles for expressing propositions, which bear truth values and can serve as premises and conclusions in arguments.

Utterance meaning concerns the semantic content of concrete speech acts. It goes beyond sentence meaning by considering how the context or circumstances in which a sentence is uttered shape its meaning. For example, when a teacher says to a student "Can you open the window?", the utterance meaning is a request to open the window, contrasting with the literal sentence meaning as an inquiry into the student's ability to do so. Philosophical debates address the relation between sentence meaning and utterance meaning, including the question of whether one is more fundamental than the other.

=== Descriptive and emotive ===
Descriptive meaning, also called cognitive (Note: The term cognitive meaning is also associated with a more specific sense, encompassing both the object to which an expression refers and the way how it presents that object.) or propositional meaning, signifies objects or conveys facts about the world. It takes the form of propositions, which state information that can be true or false. Descriptive meaning contrasts with emotive meaning, also termed expressive meaning, which reflects the speaker's emotions or evokes emotions in the audience. For example, yelling "Ouch!" after stepping on a sharp piece of glass is an expression of emotive meaning, whereas the statement "I just felt a sudden sharp pain" has descriptive meaning. A single expression can have both descriptive and emotive meaning. Similarly, two words may be synonyms regarding their descriptive meaning by referring to the same entities but differ in their emotive meaning. In this case, they express different evaluative attitudes, like the contrast between the words dad and father.

Various philosophical discussions address whether sentences within a given domain have primarily descriptive or emotive meaning. For instance, ethical cognitivists argue that moral language, like the sentence "murder is wrong", has descriptive meaning and can be true or false. Ethical emotivists, by contrast, hold that such sentences have primarily emotive meaning by expressing attitudes of approval or disapproval. This outlook is a form of anti-realism that challenges the claim that ethical evaluations represent objective reality. Similar debates are found in the field of aesthetics regarding the value of artworks.

In addition to its contrast with emotive meaning, descriptive meaning is also distinguished from normative or prescriptive meaning: descriptive meaning expresses what is the case, whereas normative meaning conveys what should be the case.

=== Speaker, conventional, and figurative ===
The contrast between speaker meaning and conventional meaning depends on the source or location of the meaning. Speaker meaning is what a person intends to communicate, reflecting the ideas they associate with an expression. Conventional meaning arises from shared social norms that govern language use in a community, such as the dictionary definition of a word. Speaker meaning and conventional meaning align when a person follows established conventions to express what they intend to say. However, they can come apart when a speaker employs a word idiosyncratically or mistakenly in a way that diverges from public linguistic norms, which can lead to miscommunication. (Note: A well-known quote related to speaker meaning comes from Lewis Carroll's Through the Looking Glass, where the character Humpty Dumpty defends his odd use of words by saying "When I use a word ... it means just what I choose it to mean—neither more nor less.")

An overlapping distinction is between literal and figurative meaning. The literal meaning of an expression is its standard sense based on conventional use. Figurative meaning involves the creative use of expressions in unconventional ways, often in situations where it is clear from the context that the standard sense is not intended. This occurs in verbal irony when a person says the opposite of what they mean, such as remarking "Great job!" after a disastrous failure. Philosophical discussions explore whether figurative meaning can be explained in terms of literal meaning together with contextual factors, and whether figurative uses are a primary mechanism by which language changes and new meanings and concepts emerge.

=== Others ===
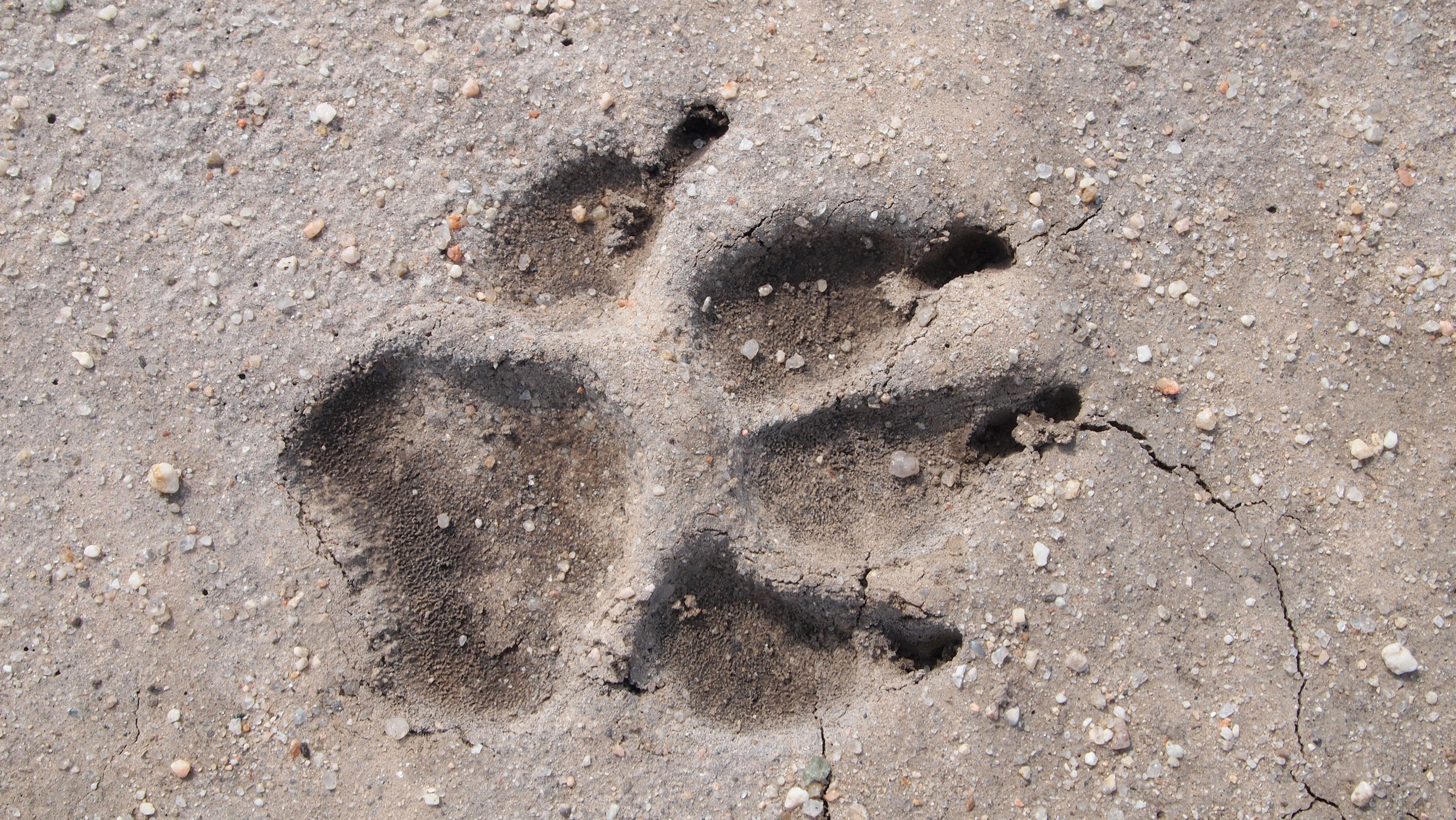
The footprint of a dog is a natural sign because of the physical connection to the animal, whereas the word dog is a non-natural sign because the relation to the animal depends on linguistic conventions.

The distinction between natural and non-natural meaning depends on the relation between a sign and what it stands for. Natural meaning rests on non-conventional relations and is not affected by what people intend or desire. For example, smoke acts as a sign of fire because fire causes smoke, independent of community-specific norms and practices. Similarly, the footprint of a dog points to a dog because of the physical connection between the sign and the animal. Non-natural meaning, by contrast, is grounded in established norms and conventions. In this case, there is no inherent link between the sign and its referent, making the connection arbitrary in a certain sense. For instance, the meaning of the word cherry is non-natural, and studying its sounds does not reveal an intrinsic link to the fruit. Sign systems used in human communication are often non-natural, such as language and the color-coding of traffic lights. (Note: A related classification, initially proposed by Charles Sanders Peirce, distinguishes between icons, indices, and symbols. Icons represent through similarity, such as a portrait; indices represent through a direct physical link, such as a footprint; and symbols operate through convention-based associations, such as language.)

The distinction between narrow and wide (or broad) meaning concerns the influence of external circumstances. Narrow meaning is fully determined by the internal states of a person, such as brain states, and reflects the conceptual role that meaning contents play in thought. Accordingly, two persons with exactly the same internal states share the same narrow meanings in their thoughts. Wide meaning, by contrast, also considers external factors that may influence to which object a meaning content refers. In this respect, two persons with identical internal states in different circumstances can have different wide meanings because their thoughts relate differently to their environments. The distinction between narrow and wide meaning plays a central role in philosophical discussions about the nature of mind, particularly concerning the question of whether mental states depend only on brain states or also on the environment.

Focal meaning describes a pattern in which several applications of a term to diverse items are all intelligible through their shared reference to a primary case. For example, the word healthy can be applied to persons, food items, places, and complexion, unified by their common relation to health.

The meaning of life concerns a form of non-linguistic meaning discussed in metaphysics and value theory. It addresses the significance of human life or existence as a whole, asking whether there is a higher purpose or value to the world. Naturalism is one response to this question, arguing that meaning is inherent in the physical world, either as objective values that apply universally or as subjective values shaped by individual preferences. Supernaturalism, another approach, posits a source of meaning beyond the physical world, such as the will of a divine creator imbuing existence with significance. Existential nihilism rejects both views, holding instead that there is no higher purpose and that life is ultimately meaningless.

== Central concepts ==
=== Sense, reference, and truth ===
Various concepts are used in the philosophical analysis of meaning. Sense and reference are commonly discussed as two central components. (Note: The terminology originates in the translation of Gottlob Frege's work, in which he employed the German terms Sinn and Bedeutung. Depending on one's terminology, this distinction is identical to or overlaps with the distinctions between intension and extension and between connotation and denotation.) The reference of an expression is the object or class of entities to which it applies. The sense of an expression is the way it presents or refers to those entities. For example, the terms morning star and evening star have the same reference since both signify the planet Venus. However, they have different senses because they present this object in different ways. Some expressions lack reference since they do not denote any existing entity, including empty names like Pegasus.

Meaning is closely associated with speech acts, which are communicative actions. Speech acts are often analyzed in terms of semantic content and force. The semantic content of a speech act is the information it carries or the subject matter it concerns. Its force is how the speaker uses this content, as in the contrast between asserting, questioning, promising, or demanding a specific outcome. According to the content–force analysis, the utterances "All dogs can swim." and "All cats can swim." have different contents but the same force: both make assertions, but they assert different things. By contrast, "All dogs can swim." and "Can all dogs swim?" have the same content but different forces: they share the subject matter of the swimming ability of dogs, but the first states this as a fact while the second poses it as a question.

Truth and falsity are features of the meaning of declarative sentences or assertive speech acts: true sentences align with reality, describing the world as it is, whereas false ones fail to do so. Various philosophical theories of the nature of truth have been proposed. They include the views that truth is correspondence to facts, coherence among beliefs, or practical usefulness and the ability to withstand unlimited inquiry. A truth condition is a situation in which a sentence would be true. One view analyzes the meaning of declarative sentences in terms of truth conditions, holding that understanding a sentence is about knowing what the world must be like for the sentence to be true.

=== Vagueness, ambiguity, and context-dependence ===
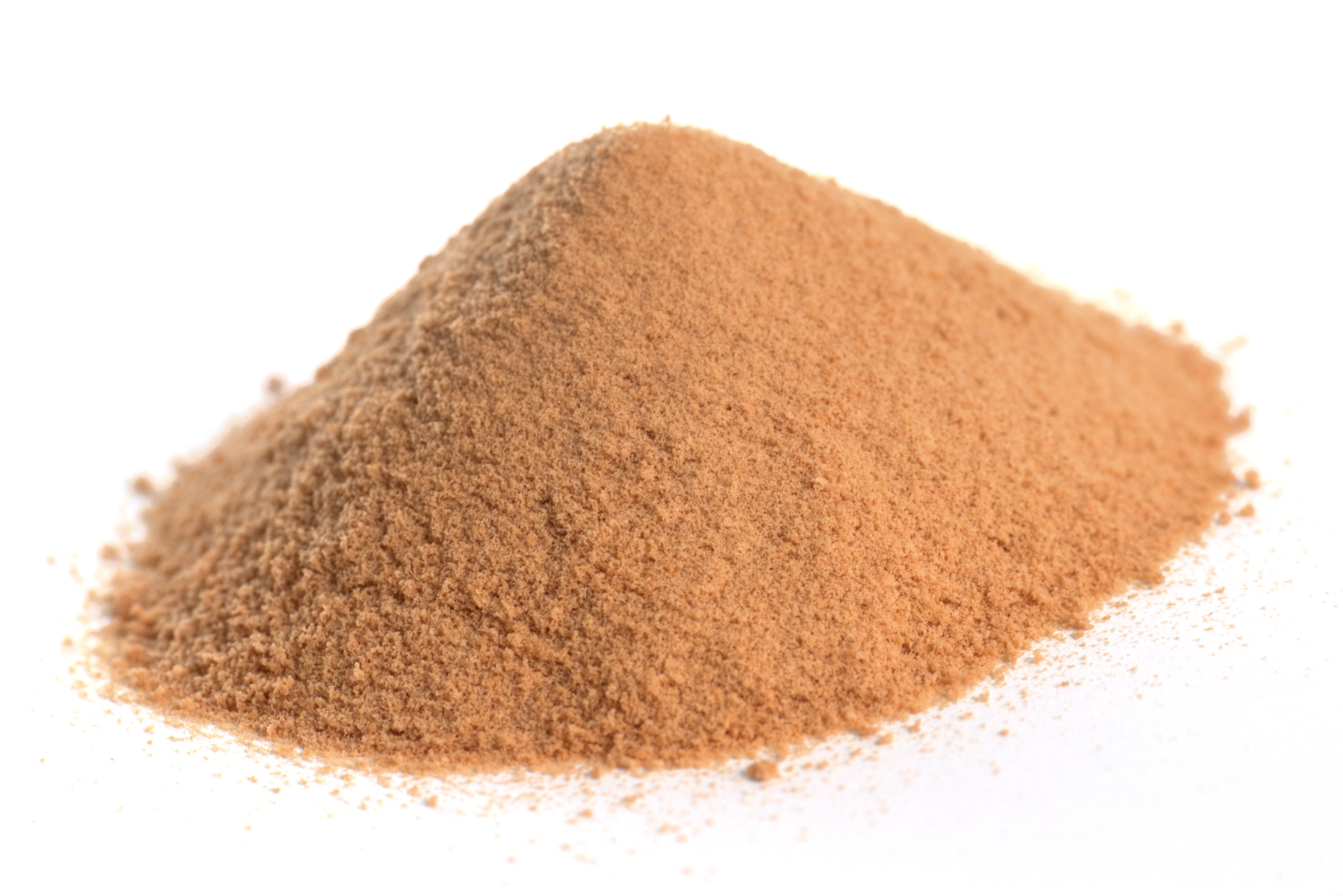
The sorites paradox is a logical puzzle regarding the meaning of vague expressions. It asks when a heap of sand stops being a heap as grains are individually removed.

Vagueness and ambiguity concern meanings that lack clear or unified boundaries. An expression is vague if there are borderline cases in which it is indeterminate whether it applies. For example, the term tall is vague because there is no clear line separating entities that are tall from those that are not. Vagueness plays a key role in the sorites paradox, which centers on borderline cases and gradual change, such as the difficulty of determining when a heap of sand stops being a heap as individual grains are successively removed. Vagueness differs from ambiguity, a quality of expressions with several distinct meanings. For example, lexical ambiguity concerns word meanings, such as the word bat, which denotes a winged mammal and a club-like piece of sports equipment. Other forms of ambiguity include structural ambiguity, in which the grammatical structure of a sentence can be interpreted in several ways, and referential ambiguity, in which it is unclear which entity an expression, such as the pronoun he, denotes.

Context-dependence, or context-sensitivity, involves meaning contents that are underspecified without a context. They require information from the surrounding situation or discourse to acquire a determinate meaning. For example, the expressions here, last week, and she need contextual cues to fix which location, time, or person is meant. Contextualism is the view that the meaning of most or all expressions or utterances is context-dependent.

Context-dependence is closely related to implicature, which encompasses aspects of the meaning of an utterance that are not overtly stated but arise from shared background assumptions and conversational norms. Such norms include the idea that people try to promote the goal of a conversation by saying things that are true, informative, and relevant to the topic. For example, responding "I have to study." to the question "Can you go to the movies?" has the implicature that the speaker is unable to go without stating this overtly, assuming implicitly that the response is relevant and answers the question indirectly.

=== Other concepts ===
According to the principle of compositionality, the meaning of the sentence "Laika was a dog" depends on the meanings of the words Laika, was, a, and dog, as well as the order in which they appear.

The principle of compositionality states that the meaning of a complex expression is determined by the meanings of its parts and the way they are combined. For example, the meaning of the sentence "Laika was a dog" depends on the meanings of the words Laika, was, a, and dog, as well as the order in which they appear. Compositionality is often used to explain productivity—the idea that competent speakers can form and understand an almost infinite number of sentences after learning a finite number of words and syntactic rules. Philosophers debate to what extent compositionality fully determines meaning or merely influences it. For example, idiomatic expressions like "kick the bucket" challenge the principle of compositionality since it is not always obvious that their meaning is determined by their parts.

Normativity is a quality of rules, judgments, or concepts that prescribe how things should be. Meaning is often described as a normative concept because it implies standards of correctness: a meaningful expression is correctly applied to some situations but not to others. For example, the word green is correctly applied to green objects but not to red ones. Philosophers discuss the precise relation between meaning and normativity, including whether the concept of meaning can be reduced to norms or conditions of correct application.

Meaning is typically attributed to signs, which are entities that stand for something else. A sign vehicle, one proposed component of a sign, is its physical form, such as sound waves, ink marks, or gestures. The referent is the represented entity, which may be an external object or an idea. The sign relation is the connection between a sign vehicle and its referent, such as the contrast between conventional and non-conventional connections. A sign system is a framework of relations and rules governing how signs are formed, combined, and interpreted, such as the Spanish language. Understanding a sign usually requires some form of interpretation to reveal its meaning.

Translation is the process of converting an expression from one sign system to another with the goal of preserving its meaning. It is controversial to what extent this goal is achievable. For example, the thesis of the indeterminacy of translation states that it is typically impossible to decide which among multiple possible translations with slightly different meanings is correct. (Note: Willard Van Orman Quine arrived at this thesis through the thought experiment of radical translation, which involves a linguist trying to translate an unknown language without any prior knowledge by studying only the observable behavior of its speakers.)

Meaning postulates are principles that describe general logical relations between concepts, such as the idea that the concept bachelor implies the concept unmarried. They have been used to explain the truth of analytic statements—statements whose truth depends only on the meanings of the words they use, independent of empirical reality, such as the statement "all bachelors are unmarried". According to one view, analytic statements are true because the relations among their meaning contents are fixed by meaning postulates.

== Theories ==
Theories of meaning seek to identify the nature, sources, and functions of meaning, typically focusing on linguistic meaning. They explain what meaning is, how expressions acquire it, and why some expressions are meaningful while others are not. One approach divides them based on their theoretical goals into semantic and metasemantic theories. Semantic theories aim to clarify which meanings are assigned to semantic contents, asking what the meanings of different expressions are. Metasemantic theories aim to explain why an expression has the meaning it has, studying the underlying facts in virtue of which expressions acquire their semantic contents.

=== Based on reference and truth conditions ===
Referential theories identify meaning with the entities to which expressions point.

Referential theories assert that the meaning of expressions is given by what they stand for. This view treats expressions similar to labels that denote real entities in the world, with different types of expressions associated with different kinds of referents. According to a common approach, a name, such as Mahatma Gandhi, means the individual person it denotes; a general term, such as dog, means the set of entities to which it applies; and a full sentence, such as "The cat sat on the mat", means the situation it describes or the truth value it has. A similar outlook is presented in the picture theory of meaning, an early view of Ludwig Wittgenstein. It holds that expressions act like pictures or models of reality: words correspond to basic objects, grammar mirrors relations between objects, and sentences depict possible states of affairs.

A key appeal of referential theories is their closeness to common sense: the meaning of everyday words is often explained by pointing to the entities they denote. They face difficulties in explaining expressions that do not refer to actual objects. Problematic cases include names of nonexistent entities, such as Pegasus, and expressions that do not appear to denote entities, such as very, of, and hey. Another challenge comes from coreferring terms that are not synonyms, that is, expressions that denote the same entity but differ in meaning, such as "the square root of 4" and "the cube root of 8".

Like referential theories, truth-conditional theories emphasize the relation between meaning and reality. They propose that understanding the meaning of a sentence requires understanding the conditions under which it would be true or what the world would be like in this case. An influential version, proposed by Donald Davidson, analyzes meaning in a specific language by constructing a theory that systematically explains how to relate a statement to its truth conditions. This happens in the form of so-called T-sentences, which have the form: '"$S$" is true in $L$ if and only if $p$', where $S$ is the analyzed sentence, $L$ is the language of the sentence, and $p$ encompasses the truth conditions. This approach studies general patterns of T-sentences, for example, by relying on compositionality to explain how the truth conditions of complex statements are determined by the truth conditions of their constituents. Another approach explains truth conditions in terms of possible worlds, which are alternative ways of how reality could have been. According to this view, the meaning of a sentence is the set of possible worlds in which it is true.

A central motivation for truth-conditional theories is that they explain the relation between language and reality while providing a precise way to characterize meaning. One objection is that truth-conditional theories are limited to assertions that describe the world without explaining the meaning of other sentence types, such as questions and commands. Another challenge arises from statements with identical truth-conditions but different meanings. For example, the statements "2 + 2 = 4" and "either today is Monday or it is not" have different meanings, but truth-conditional theories suggest that they have the same meaning since both are always true, regardless of what the world is like.

=== Based on mind and abstract objects ===
John Locke's ideational theory holds that words stand for ideas.

Mind-based theories characterize meaning in terms of mental processes and ideas, avoiding the focus on the relation between language and world found in referential and truth-conditional theories. The ideational theory, proposed by John Locke, holds that linguistic expressions stand for ideas in the minds of language users. On this account, the word apple means the idea that language users have of apples. This view holds that language is a medium through which people express and share their ideas with others: there are conventional relations between ideas and signs, and once language users associate an idea with a corresponding sign, they can produce the sign and thereby evoke the idea in the minds of other language users who perceive it. Despite its intuitive appeal, the ideational theory faces various objections. For example, the meaning of a word is typically considered a public and social phenomenon that exists for the entire language community, whereas ideas are subjective, and different people may associate different ideas with the same word.

A related mind-based approach, proposed by Jerry Fodor, holds that meaning in natural language depends on mental representations in thought. It maintains that thought itself has a linguistic structure, with concepts as basic building blocks that can be combined following grammar-like rules. According to this view, natural-language expressions are meaningful because they are paired with mental representations, as in the link between the word house and the mental representation house.

A different psychological approach, developed by Paul Grice, defines meaning in terms of intentions rather than ideas or concepts. Focusing on speaker meaning instead of conventional meaning, this view argues that people usually aim to provoke some kind of reaction in their audience, such as causing them to form a certain belief. It holds that understanding the meaning of a statement involves recognizing the underlying communicative intention. One strength of this view is that it can explain the meaning of nonliteral expressions, such as irony and sarcasm, by considering how the speaker intended them. Challenges to the intentionalist theory of meaning come from cases in which people produce meaningful expressions without intending to communicate with others and cases in which the speaker's communicative intention does not align with what the audience reasonably interprets the speaker to mean.

Proposition theory argues that meanings are not subjective mental ideas but abstract objects that exist independently of mind and language users. According to this view, declarative sentences express propositions, which are conceived as abstract objects that act as the primary locus of meaning. Different sentences can express the same proposition, such as the English sentence "Snow is white" and the German sentence "Schnee ist weiß". Similarly, mental states, such as beliefs, can be about propositions. Proposition theory is often combined with the view that propositions have an internal structure, meaning that they are complex entities made up of several parts. This approach holds that propositions consist of units such as concepts, objects, properties, or relations. Unlike those units, a proposition is a complete thought that can be true or false. One difficulty for proposition theory is its reliance on abstract objects: it is controversial whether such objects exist and, if so, how people could grasp them when they understand the meaning of something.

=== Based on use ===
Position: a8 black rook, b8 black knight, c8 black bishop, d8 black queen, e8 black king, f8 black bishop, h8 black rook, b7 black pawn, e7 black pawn, f7 black pawn, g7 black pawn, h7 black pawn, a6 black pawn, d6 black pawn, f6 black knight, d4 white knight, e4 white pawn, c3 white knight, a2 white pawn, b2 white pawn, c2 white pawn, f2 white pawn, g2 white pawn, h2 white pawn, a1 white rook, c1 white bishop, d1 white queen, e1 white king, f1 white bishop, h1 white rook

Wittgenstein suggested that the meaning of an expression depends on rules governing its use, similar to how the role of chess pieces depends on the rules of chess.

Use-based theories reject the idea that meaning consists of special objects, like ideas or propositions. Instead, they hold that the meaning of an expression is determined by how it is used or the function it plays in human social behavior. An influential use theory, inspired by Wittgenstein's later works, focuses on publicly observable linguistic behavior and the norms that govern it. According to this view, language resembles a game, and understanding linguistic expressions requires knowing the rules that govern this game. In this regard, using words is similar to moving pieces in a chess game, where understanding the role of a piece, such as a rook, involves familiarity with the rules governing how it can move and interact with other pieces. Wittgenstein argued that there are many language games, each with its own rules, and that the same expression can occur in different games with different use-dependent meanings. For example, uttering "Water!" may function as a request, a warning, or an answer, depending on the context. While this form of use-theory can explain the meanings of expressions in simple language games, it faces challenges in applying these principles to more complex cases, such as understanding long and novel sentences one has never heard before.

Inferentialism, also called conceptual role semantics, is a form of use theory that focuses on the practice of drawing inferences. Developed by Wilfrid Sellars and Robert Brandom, it holds that the meaning of an expression depends on the role it plays in inferences, such as the reasons that can support it and the conclusions that can be drawn from it. For example, the meaning of the word brother is associated with various inferential patterns: being a male sibling entails being a brother, and being a brother entails having parents. Inferentialists take these and comparable inferences to constitute a word's meaning. Unlike some other forms of use theory, inferentialism can also account for the meanings of complex expressions by analyzing their inferential patterns. One objection targets its exclusive focus on inferential practices, arguing that it struggles to explain how expressions can refer to non-linguistic phenomena.

=== Other theories ===
Holism and atomism are views about how meaning is determined by relations among expressions. According to holism, the meanings of individual expressions depend on other expressions: they are meaningful only against the background of a broader system of language or a network of beliefs. This view is rejected by atomism, which holds that the meanings of individual expressions are independent: in principle, they can be understood in isolation without reference to a larger linguistic or conceptual system. Molecularism, an intermediate view, holds that meanings depend on a small semantic field of related expressions but not on the entire system. According to this view, the meaning of the verb to kill depends in part on the meanings of the verbs to cause and to die.

Verificationism is the view that the meaning of a statement is the procedure required to verify it or the set of experiences that would show it to be true. (Note: Verificationism is related to assertability theory, which analyzes meaning in terms of the conditions under which asserting a statement is justified.) A key motivation for this view is the idea that the meaning of true sentences should make a difference to how people experience the world. Accordingly, verificationists hold that a statement is meaningless if it makes no difference because no possible experience could verify it. (Note: Verificationists typically make exceptions for statements that are true by definition, such as "no bachelors are married".) This idea has been used by verificationists to dismiss certain areas of philosophy, such as traditional metaphysics, by claiming that their statements are neither true nor false but meaningless. One central objection to verificationism holds that this view is too wide-reaching by dismissing many statements that are typically considered meaningful. For example, the statement "The universe began five minutes ago, including all memories and records" seems meaningful although it is unclear which experiences could verify it. Another criticism from the perspective of holism argues that individual statements do not have verification conditions since their verification depends on assumptions about other statements.

Behaviorist theories analyze meaning in terms of stimuli and responses, focusing on the situations that trigger an expression and the responses it elicits in an audience. For example, the meaning of yelling "Fire!" is associated with situations in which an individual detects a dangerous fire and with responses such as fleeing or extinguishing it. Accordingly, behaviorist theories of meaning hold that to learn the meaning of an expression, one needs to acquire the relevant stimulus-response pairs. Critics argue that the same expression can prompt different responses in different people without having different meanings for them and that behaviorism struggles to explain compositionality or how the meaning of a complex expression depends on its parts.

Teleosemantics explains meaning, representation, and related phenomena in terms of their biological function: the purposes or evolutionary roles they serve. A key idea of this approach is that meaning is not limited to humans but is a more basic biological phenomenon found also in other species. For example, vervet monkeys have different warning calls for leopards, eagles, and snakes. According to teleosemantics, these calls have different meanings or representational contents because they are associated with different behavioral responses and functions.

Some theories of meaning target specific types of expressions rather than linguistic meaning in general. For example, theories of names examine the meaning of proper names, such as Socrates and Paris. Descriptivist and direct-reference theories debate whether the meaning of a name is an exhaustive description of the named entity, (Note: For instance, descriptive theories may argue that part of the meaning of the name Socrates is "teacher of Plato".) or whether names establish a direct connection without descriptive content. (Note: The causal origin theory, another approach, analyzes the meaning of names in terms of their causal history: an initial baptism and a chain of transmission of use establish a connection between a name and its referent.) Other expressions whose meaning is discussed in philosophy of language include indexicals, such as I; definite descriptions, such as "the author of Waverley"; and quantifiers, such as everyone.

== In various areas ==
The problem of meaning is relevant to many areas of philosophy and related disciplines. It is a central topic in the philosophy of language, which examines the nature and sources of linguistic meaning. It considers different aspects or features of meaning, such as sense, reference, and truth, while distinguishing between speaker and conventional meaning, and between descriptive and emotive meaning. Philosophers of language examine theories of meaning and evaluate arguments for and against them, discussing the roles of reference, truth conditions, ideas, and patterns of use. (Note: The study of linguistic meaning is sometimes divided into semantics, which investigates word and sentence meaning, and pragmatics, which investigates utterance meaning. Philosophers also distinguish semantics from metasemantics, which examines the foundations of meaning by asking which facts determine that an expression has one meaning rather than another.) Their interest overlaps with that of social philosophers and social scientists regarding the ways in which social norms and conventions of linguistic communities shape the meaning of expressions.

Semiotics, a related field, is the study of signs and examines how meaning is communicated or generated through sign use, a process known as semiosis. Unlike the philosophy of language, it has a broader scope not limited to linguistic expressions. For example, it also investigates how paintings, maps, footprints, and advertisements function as signs and convey meaning.

As the study of correct reasoning, logic is interested in logical relations between propositions or meaning contents that serve as premises and conclusions in arguments, examining how their logical forms affect the validity of arguments. It uses formal languages with expressions such as singular terms, predicates, and logical connectives to articulate the logical form of propositions. Logicians and formal semanticists often rely on model theory to assign meaning to these expressions by defining an interpretation function that maps expressions to entities in an abstract model, for example, by mapping individual terms to objects and predicates to sets of objects.

Philosophy of mind is concerned with the semantic contents of mental states, such as beliefs, perceptions, desires, and intentions. It examines the relation between mind and reality, for example, by studying intentionality as the ability of the mind to refer to the world or be about entities other than itself.

Hermeneutics is the study of interpretation. Traditionally, it examines the methods and principles through which interpreters can discover the underlying meaning of religious and philosophical texts. For example, the hermeneutic circle is the idea that interpretation involves a circular movement in which preconceptions guide interpretation while interpretation reshapes preconceptions. (Note: Philosophers such as Martin Heidegger and Hans-Georg Gadamer have suggested that hermeneutics is not limited to the interpretation of texts but applies to understanding in general.)

A similar topic in aesthetics concerns the meanings of artworks, considering factors such as their representational content, expressive qualities, and the artist's underlying intent. In ethics, moral philosophers ask whether moral language expresses objective facts or subjective emotions. Philosophers of religion and existentialists debate whether life has meaning or a higher purpose and, if so, whether it is objectively true for everyone or limited to subjective perspectives.

== History ==
=== Ancient and medieval ===
In ancient Greece, Plato (c. 427 – c. 347 BCE) discussed whether the relation between names and things is natural or conventional. His student Aristotle (384–322 BCE) held that linguistic expressions are connected to reality through thought. He argued that different languages use different conventions, while the mental concepts they express are shared universally. Aristotle also examined the logical form of statements and their function as premises and conclusions in valid inferences. Stoicism, which arose in the 3rd century BCE, analyzed different types of words, such as names, common nouns, and verbs, based on their semantic and syntactic roles. They also distinguished between spoken words, written words, and the meanings of utterances, and explored their relations.

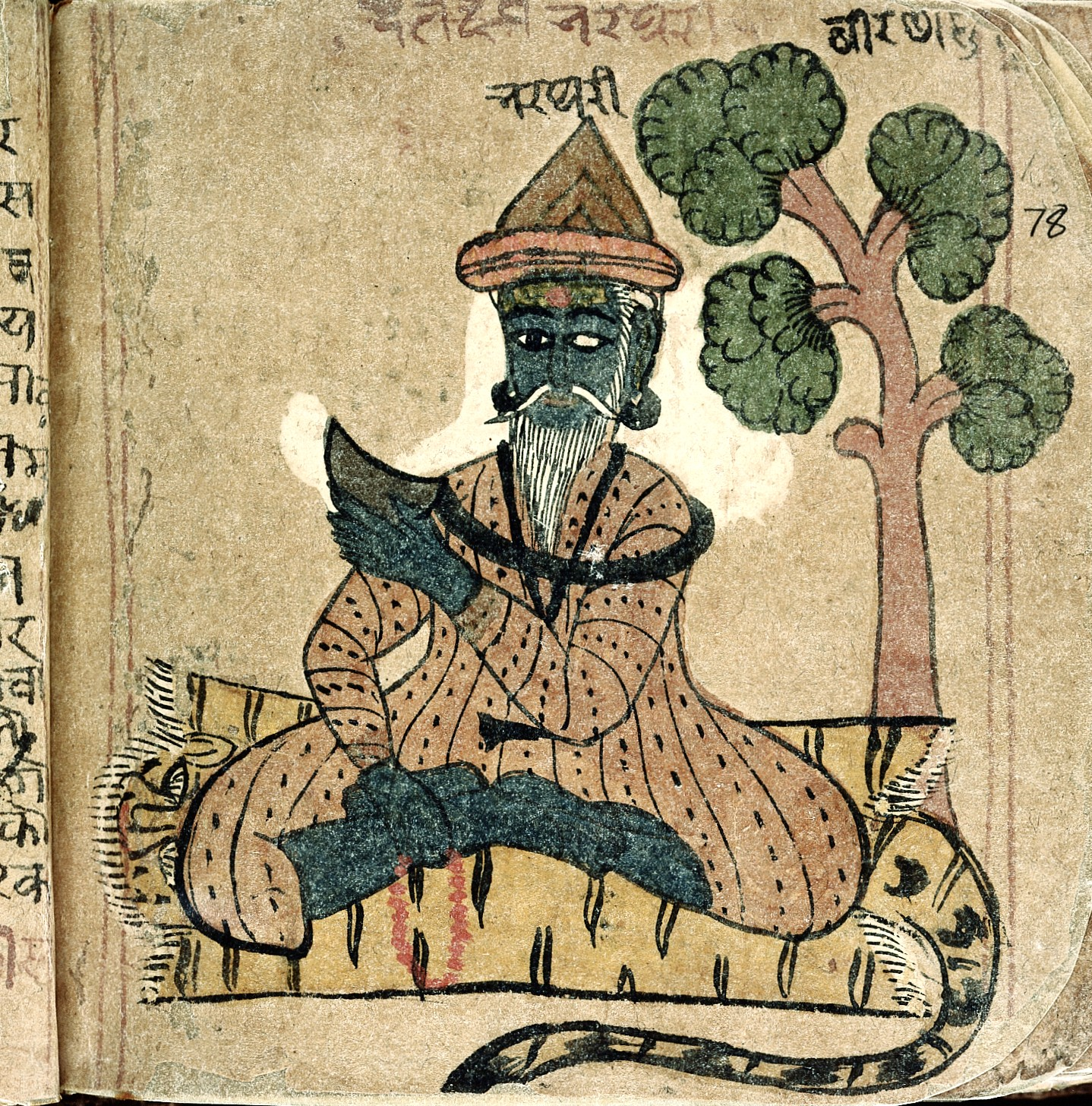
Bhartṛhari (4th–5th century CE) held that meaning resides primarily in whole sentences, not in isolated words.

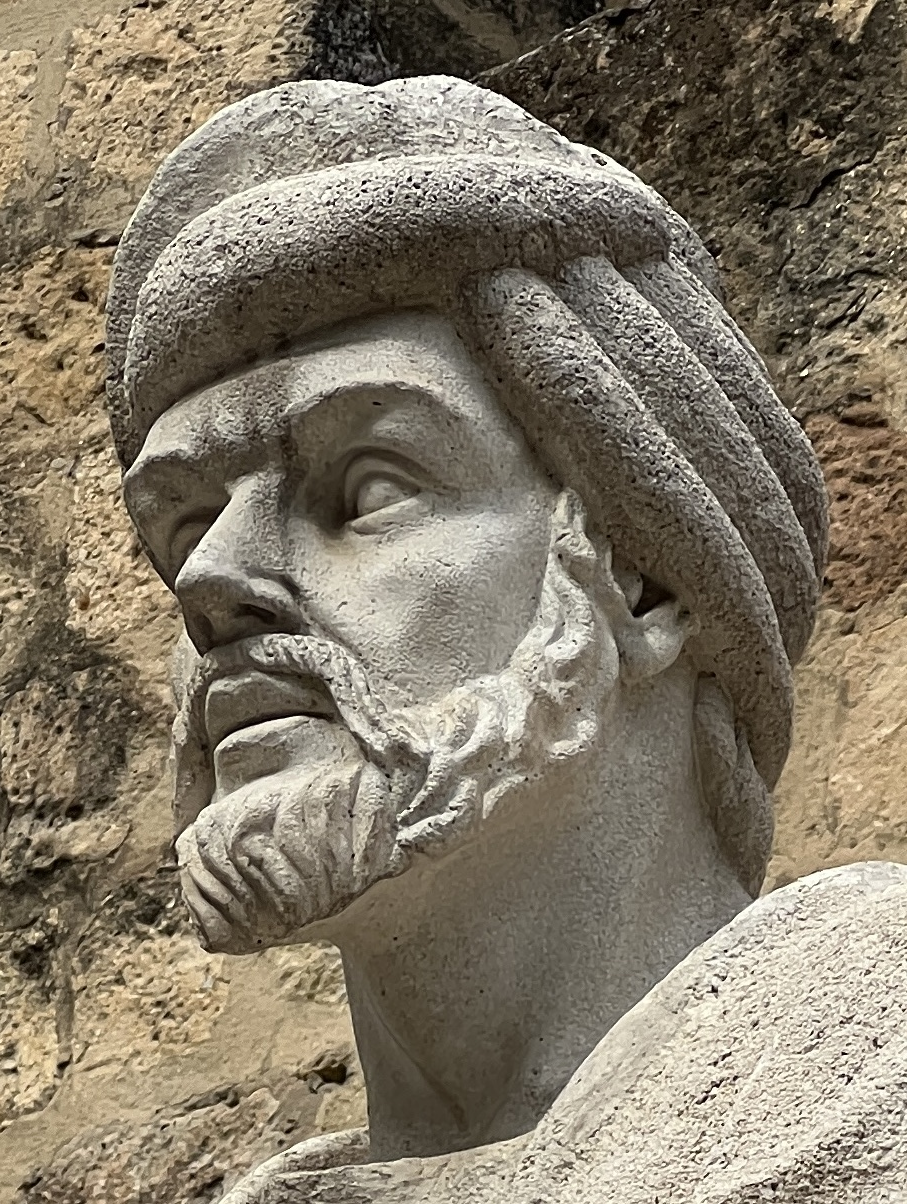
Averroes maintained that scriptural references to miracles and Allah should not be interpreted literally to avoid inconsistencies of meaning.

Several theories of meaning were discussed in ancient Indian philosophy, often focusing on the Sanskrit term artha, which denotes both linguistic and non-linguistic meaning. The schools of Nyāya and Vaiśeṣika, which emerged in the first millennium BCE, argued that words refer to real things in the world and held that the relation between a word and its denoted entity is conventional and established by God. The school of Mīmāṃsā, which originated roughly in the fourth century BCE, accepted the realist view but rejected the conventionalist and God-centered outlook, arguing instead that the connection between a word and its meaning is innate and uncreated. Buddhism, which arose in the 5th century BCE, tended to associate linguistic meaning with conceptual constructions while being skeptical about the ability to accurately describe reality. The philosopher Bhartṛhari (4th–5th century CE) combined realist and idealist elements to explain how expressions without a referent, such as "horn of a rabbit", can be meaningful. He argued that sentences, rather than individual words, are the primary bearers of meaning.

In ancient China, Mohism originated in the 5th century BCE and proposed a practice-oriented theory of linguistic understanding: knowing a concept, such as righteousness, is not primarily a matter of knowing its definition or meaning but of having the practical ability to distinguish righteous actions from unrighteous ones. The School of Names, another tradition that arose in the 5th century BCE, investigated the relationship between names and the things they denote, examining the role of names in judging and differentiating entities.

In medieval philosophy, Augustine of Hippo (354–430 CE) distinguished between the meaning contents expressed by an utterance and the entities to which it refers. He argued that such contents are grasped in inner thought, which precedes outward speech. Peter Abelard (1079–1142 CE) contrasted the content of a speech act with its assertion. He held that only assertions can be true or false and that the same content can also be expressed in other speech acts, such as questions and wishes. William of Ockham (c. 1287–1347 CE) argued that spoken and written language derive their meaning from mental representations. He also held that thought itself has a language-like structure.

In the Islamic tradition, discussions of meaning were often motivated by religious disagreements. Abu Bishr Matta (870–940) and Abu Sa'id al-Sirafi (893–979) examined the relationship of logic and language. Matta argued that the principles of meaning and thought are language-independent. Al-Sirafi contended that logic cannot be separated from language, and that understanding the meaning of Islamic texts, such as the Quran, requires knowledge of the Arabic language. Another debate addressed literal and metaphorical interpretations of the Quran. Al-Ghazali (c. 1058–1111) tended to support literal readings of miracles, emphasizing Allah's absolute power. Averroes (1126–1198), by contrast, held that an understanding of the natural order underlies commonly understood meanings and that miracles threaten established assumptions about the intelligibility of the world. Accordingly, he held that descriptions of miracles and Allah should be reinterpreted to avoid paradoxes of literal readings.

In premodern thought, religious and mythological narratives often provided frameworks for understanding the meaning of life. For example, Indian philosophy linked the human purpose to ethical duty, self-realization, and spiritual liberation, while the Abrahamic traditions emphasized the importance of fulfilling God's will.

=== Modern and contemporary ===
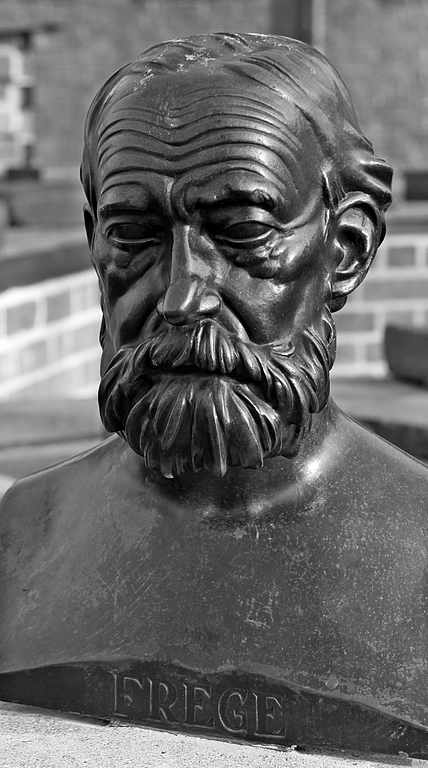
Gottlob Frege developed predicate logic, examined the principle of compositionality, argued that the meanings of sentences exist independently of minds, and introduced the contrast between sense and reference.

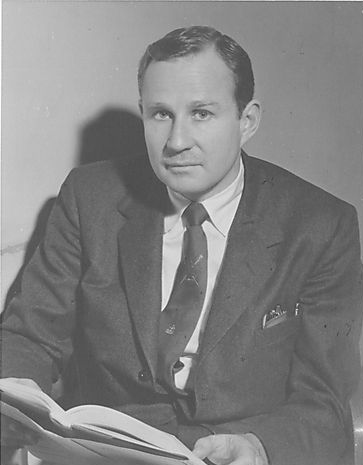
Wilfrid Sellars developed inferentialism, arguing that the meaning of an expression depends on its role in inferences.

In early modern philosophy, Thomas Hobbes (1588–1679) regarded words as tools of reasoning that make it possible to form general ideas and preserve thoughts over time. The Port-Royal thinkers Antoine Arnauld (1612–1694) and Pierre Nicole (1625–1695) argued that a universal rational structure underlies both thought and language, an idea also explored by Gottfried Wilhelm Leibniz (1646–1716). Leibniz proposed a criterion for assessing whether two expressions have the same meaning by checking whether one expression can be replaced with the other wherever it occurs without changing truth. John Locke (1632–1704) proposed a psychological theory of meaning, arguing that words stand for ideas in the speaker's mind. Wilhelm von Humboldt (1767–1835) viewed language as a creative activity that shapes meaning and understanding rather than merely representing them.

Examining the meaning of life, Arthur Schopenhauer (1788–1860) held that reality is the manifestation of an irrational will engaged in endless striving without a higher purpose, resulting in overall suffering. Friedrich Nietzsche (1844–1900) rejected Schopenhauer's pessimism, arguing instead that people should strive to create their own values. Jean-Paul Sartre (1905–1980) and Albert Camus (1913–1960) held that life is absurd: humans seriously pursue goals despite the absence of an objective higher purpose.

John Stuart Mill (1806–1873) distinguished between denotation—what a term refers to—and connotation—the evoked attributes of the denoted entity. Charles Sanders Peirce (1839–1914) and Ferdinand de Saussure (1857–1913) separately developed the field of semiotics, studying how signs convey meaning.

Gottlob Frege (1848–1925) was a foundational figure in modern philosophy of language. He introduced predicate logic as a formal framework to analyze the logical form of statements, discussed the principle of compositionality, and argued that the meanings of sentences are eternal entities that exist independently of individual minds. Exploring a contrast similar to the one discussed by Mill, Frege distinguished between sense and reference, differentiating how an expression presents an entity from the entity to which it refers. Bertrand Russell (1872–1970) analyzed the meaning of statements in terms of structured propositions composed of units such as objects, properties, and relations.

Edmund Husserl (1859–1938) explored meaning from a phenomenological perspective, examining the role of meaning contents in subjective experience and how they relate to objects. His student Martin Heidegger (1889–1976) related meaning to human existence and explored how practical engagement makes the world intelligible. Influenced by Heidegger, Hans-Georg Gadamer (1900–2002) studied interpretation, presuppositions, and historical tradition as conditions of the human understanding of meaning.

In his early works, Ludwig Wittgenstein (1889–1951) suggested the picture theory of meaning and argued that meaningful language has limits, leaving silence as the proper response to what cannot be said clearly. In his later works, he analyzed meaning in terms of use and language games. J. L. Austin (1911–1960) and his student John Searle (1932–2025) developed speech act theory, which examines how utterances perform actions, including those that do not primarily describe the world, such as asking questions, making promises, and issuing commands. B. F. Skinner (1904–1990) proposed a behaviorist theory of meaning that focuses on how expressions are caused by stimuli and evoke responses in audiences.

Some logical positivists, such as A. J. Ayer (1910–1989) and Rudolf Carnap (1891–1970), proposed verificationism, analyzing the meaning of a statement in terms of the procedures or experiences that would establish its truth. Willard Van Orman Quine (1908–2000) rejected verificationism, proposing instead a form of holism, according to which the meaning and verification of a statement depend on its role within a larger network of beliefs. He also opposed the idea that meanings are distinct objects and words are labels for those objects, a view he termed "the myth of the museum".

Paul Grice (1913–1988) developed an intention-based theory that links the meaning of an utterance to the communicative intention of the speaker. Inferentialism, another approach, was advanced by Wilfrid Sellars (1912–1989) and Robert Brandom (born 1950), treating the meaning of an expression as the role it plays in inferences. Donald Davidson (1917–2003) proposed a framework for analyzing sentence meaning in terms of truth conditions. Another truth-conditional theory was elaborated by Saul Kripke (1940–2022) and David Lewis (1941–2001), who analyzed truth conditions in terms of possible worlds. Influenced by Wittgenstein, Kripke also discussed the rule-following paradox, which challenges the idea that the meaning of an expression is determined by past applications or private mental states rather than community consensus. Hilary Putnam (1926–2016) suggested an externalist approach, holding that the meaning of an expression is determined in part by factors external to the speaker's mind.
