= Meaning =

Meaning most commonly refers to:

- Meaning (linguistics), meaning which is communicated through the use of language
- Meaning (non-linguistic), a general term of art to capture senses of the word "meaning", independent from its linguistic uses
- Meaning (philosophy), definition, elements, and types of meaning discussed in philosophy
- The meaning of life, the significance, purpose, or worth of human existence

Meaning may also refer to:

- Meaning (psychology), epistemological position, in psychology as well as philosophy, linguistics, semiotics and sociology
- Meaning (semiotics), the distribution of signs in sign relations
- Meaning (existential), the meaning of life in contemporary existentialism
- Meaning, the product of a process of a meaning-making
- Meaning, "the individual's sense of understanding events in which he is engaged", described in Social alienation § Meaninglessness

== Arts and entertainment ==
- Meanings (album), 2004, by Gad Elbaz
- "Meaning" (House), a 2006 episode of the TV series House
- "Meaning", a 2007 song by Gavin DeGraw from Chariot
- "The Meaning", a song on Discipline (Janet Jackson album) (2008)
- The Meaning (album), 2011, by Layzie Bone

== See also ==
- Contronym
- Hermeneutics, the theory of text interpretation
- Importance, a property of entities that matter or make a difference
- Linguistics, the scientific study of language
- Logotherapy, psychotherapy based on an existential analysis
- Semantics, the study of meaning
- Meaningless (disambiguation)
