= Misery (social) =

State of extreme poverty, sadness or distress

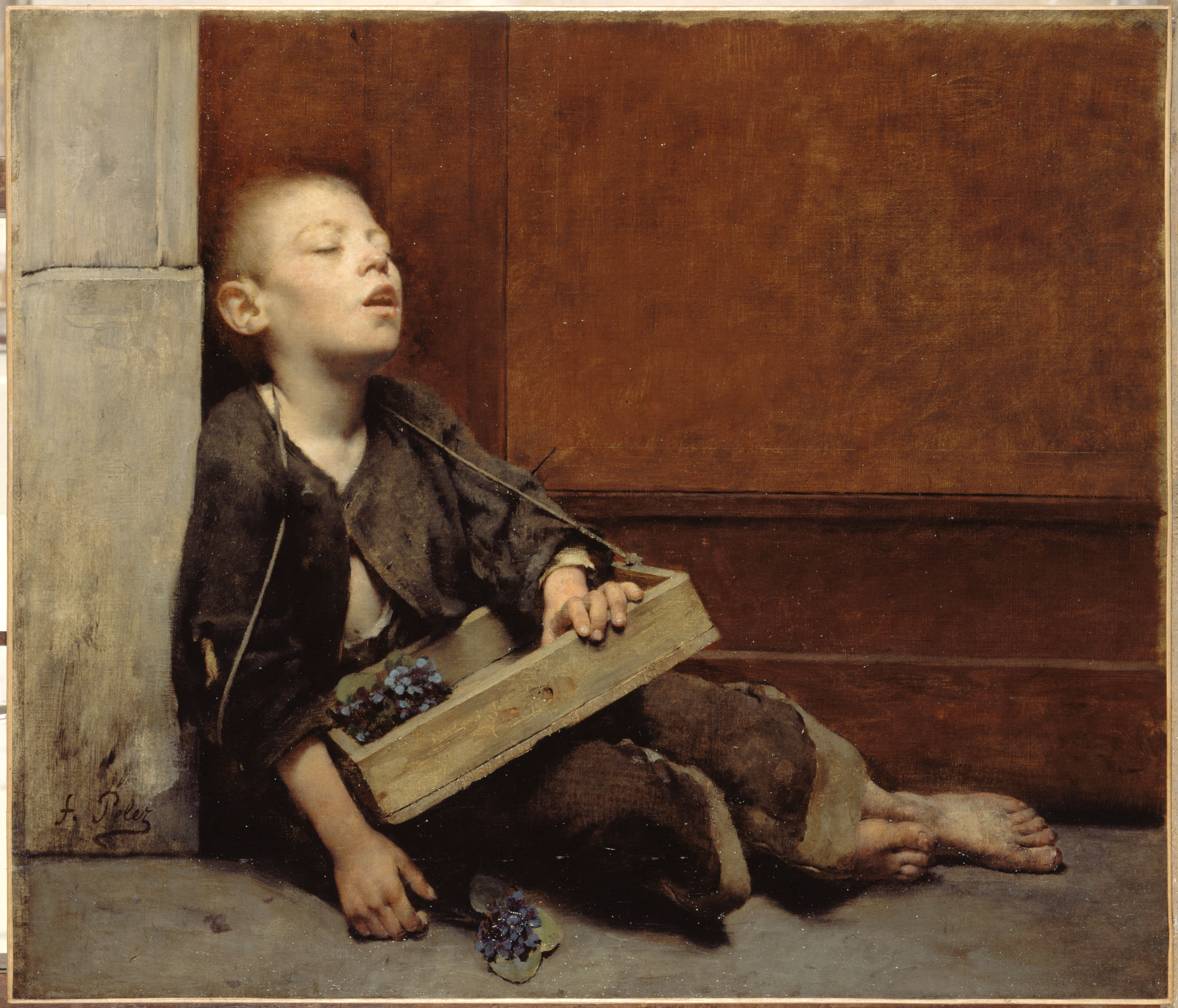
Illustration of misery, The Violet Merchant by Fernand Pelez 1885.

The term misery has several meanings that combine to convey a situation of distress: extreme deprivation, unhappiness, suffering, boredom, sadness, injustice, and even smallness ("a pittance"). It is often used to describe an extreme state of poverty but also has a denotational meaning, linked to a feeling of social exclusion.

In the Bible, the story of Job is a reflection on the meaning of human misery.

== Etymology ==
This word comes from the Latin miseria “misfortune, adversity, worry, pain” derived from miser “miserable, unhappy”.

== Poverty contrary to human rights ==
In 1992, this date of October 17, declared by a collective as the World Day for the Eradication of Poverty, was officially recognized by the UN.

We can also cite the speech by Victor Hugo delivered to the National Assembly on July 9, 1849 and entitled "destroying poverty":

"I am not, gentlemen, one of those who believe that suffering can be eliminated from this world; suffering is a divine law; but I am one of those who think and affirm that misery can be destroyed."

== Statistics ==
According to the World Bank, the share of the world's population living in poverty fell below 10% in 2015, compared to 37.1% in 1990, and is expected to reach 0% by 2030. This progress is due to globalization . International development aid, on the other hand, is counterproductive "by supporting corrupt governments and reducing economic growth, sabotaging local activities and thus continuing a cycle of dependency".

To address these criticisms, it is important to reform development aid. However, it is difficult to imagine that all the humanitarian actions undertaken over decades have not contributed, at least in part, to this reduction in poverty. The impact of development aid on the growth of the poorest countries is not negligible and could amount to one percentage point of GDP.
