= Meaningless =

Meaningless may refer to:

- Something devoid of meaning
- Meaningless (album), the debut solo album of singer and songwriter Jon Brion
- "Meaningless," a song by The Magnetic Fields from their 1999 album 69 Love Songs

== See also ==
- Pointless (disambiguation)
- Senseless (disambiguation)
