= Metasemantics =

Study of the foundations of natural language semantics

In the philosophy of language and metaphysics, metasemantics is the study of the foundations of natural language and its corresponding semantics (the philosophical study of meaning). Metasemantics searches for "the proper understanding of compositionality, the object of truth-conditional analysis, metaphysics of reference, as well as, and most importantly, the scope of semantic theory itself" and asks "how it is that expressions become endowed with their semantic significance". It may also be described as asking what sort of fundamental phenomenon the concept of "meaning" is.

== See also ==
- Metasyntax
- Metapragmatics
