= Pointless (disambiguation) =

Pointless is a British television game show.

Pointless may also refer to:

- Pointless (Australian game show), the Australian adaption of Pointless
- "Pointless" (song), a 2022 single by Lewis Capaldi
- "Pointless", a 2014 TV sitcom episode that features the game show, see list of Not Going Out episodes
- "Pointless", a 1983 song by Re-Flex from The Politics of Dancing
- "Pointless", a 1985 song by Dinosaur Jr. from Dinosaur
- "Pointless", a 1991 song by Prong from Prove You Wrong
- "Pointless", a 2007 single by The Brilliant Things
- Pointless, a 2014 comedy DVD by Dave Hughes

== See also ==
- Pointless topology, an approach to topology that avoids mentioning points
- Meaningless
- Senseless (disambiguation)
