= Semantics (logic) =

Study of the semantics, or interpretations, of formal and natural languages

In logic, the semantics or formal semantics is the study of the meaning and interpretation of formal languages, formal systems, and (idealizations of) natural languages. This field seeks to provide precise mathematical models that capture the pre-theoretic notions of truth, validity, and logical consequence. While logical syntax concerns the formal rules for constructing well-formed expressions, logical semantics establishes frameworks for determining when these expressions are true and what follows from them.

The development of formal semantics has led to several influential approaches, including model-theoretic semantics (pioneered by Alfred Tarski), proof-theoretic semantics (associated with Gerhard Gentzen and Michael Dummett), possible worlds semantics (developed by Saul Kripke and others for modal logic and related systems), algebraic semantics (connecting logic to abstract algebra), and game semantics (interpreting logical validity through game-theoretic concepts). These diverse approaches reflect different philosophical perspectives on the nature of meaning and truth in logical systems.

== Overview ==
The truth conditions of various sentences we may encounter in arguments will depend upon their meaning, and so logicians cannot completely avoid the need to provide some treatment of the meaning of these sentences. The semantics of logic refers to the approaches that logicians have introduced to understand and determine that part of meaning in which they are interested; the logician traditionally is not interested in the sentence as uttered but in the proposition, an idealised sentence suitable for logical manipulation.

Before modern logic, interpretations of logic were based on Aristotle's Organon, especially De Interpretatione. The problem of multiple generality required quantifications to be introduced, and that made it impossible to perform the kind of subject–predicate analysis in Aristotle's logic. Term logic is an attempt to modernize Aristotle's logic: find deductive systems in the spirit of Aristotle's syllogisms, but with the generality of modern logics based on the quantifier.

The main modern approaches to semantics for formal languages are the following:

- The archetype of model-theoretic semantics is Alfred Tarski's semantic theory of truth, based on his T-schema, and is one of the founding concepts of model theory. This is the most widespread approach, and is based on the idea that the meaning of the various parts of the propositions are given by the possible ways we can give a recursively specified group of interpretation functions from them to some predefined mathematical domains: an interpretation of first-order predicate logic is given by a mapping from terms to a universe of individuals, and a mapping from propositions to the truth values "true" and "false". Model-theoretic semantics provides the foundations for an approach to the theory of meaning known as truth-conditional semantics, which was pioneered by Donald Davidson. Kripke semantics introduces innovations, but is broadly in the Tarskian mold.
- Proof-theoretic semantics associates the meaning of propositions with the roles that they can play in inferences. Gerhard Gentzen, Dag Prawitz and Michael Dummett are generally seen as the founders of this approach; it is heavily influenced by Ludwig Wittgenstein's later philosophy, especially his aphorism "meaning is use".
- Truth-value semantics (also commonly referred to as substitutional quantification) was advocated by Ruth Barcan Marcus for modal logics in the early 1960s and later championed by J. Michael Dunn, Nuel Belnap, and Hugues Leblanc for standard first-order logic. James Garson has given some results in the areas of adequacy for intensional logics outfitted with such a semantics. The truth conditions for quantified formulas are given purely in terms of truth with no appeal to domains whatsoever (and hence its name truth-value semantics).
- Game semantics or game-theoretical semantics made a resurgence mainly due to Jaakko Hintikka for logics of (finite) partially ordered quantification, which were originally investigated by Leon Henkin, who studied Henkin quantifiers.
- Probabilistic semantics originated from Hartry Field and has been shown equivalent to and a natural generalization of truth-value semantics. Like truth-value semantics, it is also non-referential in nature.

== See also ==
- Algebraic semantics
- Formal semantics (natural language)
- Semantics (computer science)
- Semantics of independence-friendly logic
- Syntax (logic)
