= Insensibility (disambiguation) =

"Insensibility" is a poem written by Wilfred Owen during the First World War which explores the effect of warfare on soldiers.

Insensibility may also refer to:

- Insensibility (intelligence), a lack of understanding, reason, wit, or sense
- Insensibility (psychological attitude), a state of indifference
- Insensibility (symptom), a dramatic alteration of mental state that involves complete or near-complete lack of responsiveness to people and other environmental stimuli

== See also ==
- Insensitive
- Senseless (disambiguation)
