= Insensitive =

'Insensitivity' (sensi'tivitē) refers to a lack of sensitivity for other's feelings. It may also refer to:

- "Insensitive" (song), a 1995 song by Canadian singer Jann Arden
- Insensitive (House), an episode of the TV series House
- Culturally insensitive

== See also ==
- Insensibility (disambiguation)
- Senseless (disambiguation)
