= James Garson =

American philosopher and logician

- Known for: Modal Logic for Philosophers

Philosophical work
- Era: Contemporary philosophy
- Region: Western philosophy
- School: Analytic
- Main interests: Logic, modal logic, philosophy of mind, neural networks, formal semantics, linguistics, cognitive science, education

James Garson is an American philosopher and logician. He has made significant contributions in the study of modal logic and formal semantics. He is author of Modal Logic for Philosophers and What Logics Mean by Cambridge University Press. Garson is Professor of Philosophy at the University of Houston and has taught at the University of Pennsylvania, the University of Notre Dame, the University of Illinois at Chicago (where he was a visiting professor in computer science), and Rice University. He is a nominalist
