= Inferential role semantics =

Context-based approach to semantics

Inferential role semantics (also conceptual role semantics, functional role semantics, procedural semantics, semantic inferentialism) is an approach to the theory of meaning that identifies the meaning of an expression with its relationship to other expressions (typically its inferential relations with other expressions), in contradistinction to denotationalism, according to which denotations are the primary sort of meaning.

== Overview ==
Georg Wilhelm Friedrich Hegel is considered an early proponent of what is now called inferentialism. He believed that the ground for the axioms and the foundation for the validity of the inferences are the right consequences and that the axioms do not explain the consequence.

In its current form, inferential role semantics originated in the work of Wilfrid Sellars.

Contemporary proponents of semantic inferentialism include Robert Brandom, Gilbert Harman, Paul Horwich, Ned Block, and Luca Incurvati.

Jerry Fodor coined the term "inferential role semantics" in order to criticise it as a holistic (i.e. essentially non-compositional) approach to the theory of meaning. Inferential role semantics is sometimes contrasted to truth-conditional semantics.

Semantic inferentialism is related to logical expressivism and semantic anti-realism. The approach also bears a resemblance to accounts of proof-theoretic semantics in the semantics of logic, which associate meaning with the reasoning process.

== See also ==
- Abductive reasoning
- Semantic argument
- Sense and reference
