= Denotation =

Literal meaning of an expression

In philosophy and linguistics, the denotation of a word or expression is its strictly literal meaning. For instance, the English word "warm" denotes the property of having high temperature. Denotation is contrasted with other aspects of meaning, in particular connotation. For instance, the word "warm" may evoke calmness, coziness, or kindness (as in the warmth of someone's personality) but these associations are not part of the word's denotation. Similarly, an expression's denotation is separate from pragmatic inferences it may trigger. For instance, describing something as "warm" often implicates that it is not hot, but this is once again not part of the word's denotation.

Denotation plays a major role in several fields. Within semantics and philosophy of language, denotation is studied as an important aspect of meaning. In mathematics and computer science, assignments of denotations to expressions are a crucial step in defining interpreted formal languages. The main task of formal semantics is to reverse engineer the computational system which assigns denotations to expressions of natural languages.

== In linguistic semantics ==
In natural language semantics, denotations are conceived of as the outputs of the semantic component of the grammar. For example, the denotation of the word "blue" is the property of being blue and the denotation of the word "Barack Obama" is the person who goes by that name. Phrases also have denotations which are computed according to the principle of compositionality. For instance, the verb phrase "passed the class" denotes the property of having passed the class. Depending on one's particular theory of semantics, denotations may be identified either with terms' extensions, intensions, or other structures such as context change potentials.

When uttered in discourse, expressions may convey other associations which are not computed by the grammar and thus are not part of its denotation. For instance, depending on the context, saying "I ran five miles" may convey that you ran exactly five miles and not more. This content is not part of the sentence's denotation but rather pragmatic inferences arrived at by applying social cognition to its denotation.

== Denotation, meaning, and reference ==
Linguistic discussion of the differences between denotation, meaning, and reference is rooted in the work of Ferdinand de Saussure, specifically in his theory of semiotics written in the book Course in General Linguistics. Philosophers Gottlob Frege and Bertrand Russell have also made influential contributions to this subject.

=== Denotation and reference ===
Although they have similar meanings, denotation should not be confused with reference. A reference is a specific person, place, or thing that a speaker identifies when using a word. Vocabulary from John Searle's speech act theory can be used to define this relationship. According to this theory, the speaker's action of identifying a person, place, or thing is called referring. The specific person, place, or thing identified by the speaker is called the referent. Reference itself captures the relationship between the referent and the word or phrase used by the speaker. For referring expressions, the denotation of the phrase is most likely the phrase's referent. For content words, the denotation of the word can refer to any object, real or imagined, to which the word could be applied.

=== Denotation and meaning ===
In "On Sense and Reference", philosopher Gottlob Frege distinguished so-called Sinn, translated as sense, from Bedeutung, translated as reference or denotation when he evaluated words like the German "Morgenstern" and "Abendstern". The translations of the German terminology differ, as past translators have proposed meaning to refer to Sinn as well as Bedeutung, with a strong contemporary preference to interpret meaning as a possible translation of Bedeutung. Author Thomas Herbst uses the words "kid" and "child" to illustrate the same concept. According to Herbst, these two words have the same denotation, as they have the same member set; however, "kid" may be used in an informal speech situation whereas "child" may be used in a more formal speech situation.

== In other fields ==
- In computer science, denotational semantics is contrasted with operational semantics.
- In media studies terminology, denotation is an example of the first level of analysis: what the audience can visually see on a page. Denotation often refers to something literal, and avoids being a metaphor. Here it is usually coupled with connotation which is the second level of analysis, being what the denotation represents.

== See also ==
- Connotation
- Denotationalism
- Linguistic competence
- Principle of compositionality
- Reference
- Sense and reference
