= Senseless (disambiguation) =

Senseless is 1998 American romantic comedy film.

Senseless may also refer to:

- Senseless violence
- Senseless, 2001 novel by Stona Fitch
- Senselessness, the English translation of the 2004 novel Insensatez, originally by Horacio Castellanos
- Senseless, 1962 short silent film by Ron Rice
- Senseless (2008 film), based on Stona Fitch's novel
- Senseless (game show), dating game show on MTV UK
- "Senseless" (Law & Order: Criminal Intent), episode of Law & Order: Criminal Intent
- "Senseless" (Stefflon Don song), 2018
- Senseless (Kodak Black song), 2021

== See also ==
- Insensibility (disambiguation)
- Insensitive
- Senselessness, English translation of Spanish novel Insensatez
- Senseless Acts of Videos, an MTV series featuring stunts by Troy Hartman
