= Dag Prawitz =

Swedish philosopher and logician

- Born: 16 May 1936 (age 90); Stockholm, Sweden
- Education: Stockholm University
- Known for: Normalization and strong normalization theorems for Natural Deduction; Proof of Takeuti's conjecture Curry-Howard correspondence Proof-theoretic semantics Conjecture on the identity of proofs
- Awards: Rolf Schock prize in logic and philosophy
- Scientific career
- Fields: Mathematical Logic; Computer Science; Philosophy
- Workplaces: University of Oslo; Stockholm University
- Doctoral students: Luiz Carlos Pereira; Peter Schroeder-Heister; Cesare Cozzo

Dag Prawitz (born 1936, Stockholm) is a Swedish philosopher and logician. He is best known for his work on proof theory and the foundations of natural deduction, and for his contributions to proof-theoretic semantics.

Prawitz is a member of the Norwegian Academy of Science and Letters, of the Royal Swedish Academy of Letters and Antiquity and the Royal Swedish Academy of Science.

In the Fall of 1991, he was a Fellow at the Swedish Collegium for Advanced Study in Uppsala, Sweden.

Prawitz was awarded the Rolf Schock Prize in Logic and Philosophy in 2020.
