= Truth condition =

Condition required for a semantic statement to be true

In semantics and pragmatics, a truth condition is the condition under which a sentence is true. For example, "It is snowing in Nebraska" is true precisely when it is snowing in Nebraska. Truth conditions of a sentence do not necessarily reflect current reality. They are merely the conditions under which the statement would be true.

More formally, a truth condition makes a sentence true for a given inductive definition of truth. Understood this way, truth conditions are theoretical entities. To illustrate with an example: suppose that, in a particular truth theory which is a theory of truth where truth is somehow made acceptable despite semantic terms as close as possible, the word "Nixon" refers to Richard M. Nixon, and "is alive" is associated with the set of currently living things. Then one way of representing the truth condition of "Nixon is alive" is as the ordered pair <Nixon, {x: x is alive}>. And we say that "Nixon is alive" is true if and only if the referent (or referent of) "Nixon" belongs to the set associated with "is alive", that is, if and only if Nixon is alive.

In semantics, the truth condition of a sentence is almost universally considered distinct from its meaning. The meaning of a sentence is conveyed if the truth conditions for the sentence are understood. Additionally, there are many sentences that are understood although their truth condition is uncertain. One popular argument for this view is that some sentences are necessarily true—that is, they are true whatever happens to obtain. All such sentences have the same truth conditions, but arguably do not thereby have the same meaning. Likewise, the sets {x: x is alive} and {x: x is alive and x is not a rock} are identical—they have precisely the same members—but presumably the sentences "Nixon is alive" and "Nixon is alive and is not a rock" have different meanings.

== See also ==
- Slingshot argument
- Truth-conditional semantics
- Semantic theory of truth

== Notes and references ==
- Iten, C. (2005). Linguistic meaning, truth conditions and relevance: The case of concessives. Basingstoke, Hampshire;New York;: Palgrave Macmillan.
