= Truth-conditional semantics =

Truth-based approach to semantics

Truth-conditional semantics is an approach to semantics of natural language that sees meaning (or at least the meaning of assertions) as being the same as, or reducible to, their truth conditions. This approach to semantics is principally associated with Donald Davidson, and attempts to carry out for the semantics of natural language what Tarski's semantic theory of truth achieves for the semantics of logic.

Truth-conditional theories of semantics attempt to define the meaning of a given proposition by explaining when the sentence is true. So, for example, because 'snow is white' is true if and only if snow is white, the meaning of 'snow is white' is snow is white.

== History ==
One of the first modern forms of truth-conditional semantics was developed by Donald Davidson in Truth and Meaning (1967), although more primitive forms of the theory of semantics were developed by Gottlob Frege. It applied Tarski's semantic theory of truth to a problem it was not intended to solve, that of giving the meaning of a sentence. Davidson's desire to find an explicit theory of linguistic meaning has inspired modern formal syntax and formal semantics.

== Criticism ==
=== Refutation from necessary truths ===
Scott Soames has harshly criticized truth-conditional semantics on the grounds that it is either wrong or uselessly circular.

Under its traditional formulation, truth-conditional semantics gives every necessary truth precisely the same meaning, for all of them are true under precisely the same conditions (namely, all of them). And since the truth conditions of any unnecessarily true sentence are equivalent to the conjunction of those truth conditions and any necessary truth, any sentence means the same as its meaning plus a necessary truth. For example, if "snow is white" is true if and only if snow is white, then it is trivially the case that "snow is white" is true if and only if snow is white and 2+2=4, therefore under truth-conditional semantics "snow is white" means both that snow is white and that 2+2=4.

Soames argues further that reformulations that attempt to account for this problem must beg the question. In specifying precisely which of the infinite number of truth-conditions for a sentence will count towards its meaning, one must take the meaning of the sentence as a guide. However, we wanted to specify meaning with truth-conditions, whereas now we are specifying truth-conditions with meaning, rendering the entire process fruitless.

=== Refutation from deficiency ===
Michael Dummett (1975) has objected to Davidson's program on the grounds that such a theory of meaning will not explain what it is a speaker has to know in order for them to understand a sentence. Dummett believes a speaker must know three components of a sentence to understand its meaning: a theory of sense, indicating the part of the meaning that the speaker grasps; a theory of reference, which indicates what claims about the world are made by the sentence, and a theory of force, which indicates what kind of speech act the expression performs. Dummett further argues that a theory based on inference, such as proof-theoretic semantics, provides a better foundation for this model than truth-conditional semantics does.

=== Pragmatic intrusion ===
Some authors working within the field of pragmatics have argued that linguistic meaning, understood as the output of a purely formal analysis of a sentence-type, underdetermines truth-conditions. These authors, sometimes labeled 'contextualists', argue that the role of pragmatic processes is not just pre-semantic (disambiguation or reference assignment) or post-semantic (drawing implicatures, determining speech acts), but is also key to determining the truth-conditions of an utterance. That is why some contextualists prefer to talk about 'truth-conditional pragmatics' instead of semantics.

== See also ==
- Formal semantics
- Montague grammar
- Proof-theoretic semantics
- Dynamic semantics
- Inquisitive semantics
- Alfred Tarski
