= Private language argument =

Argument that a language understandable by only one person is incoherent

The private language argument argues that the idea of a "private language"—i.e., a language that is understandable by only a single individual—is incoherent. It was introduced by Ludwig Wittgenstein in his later work, especially in the Philosophical Investigations. The argument was central to philosophical discussion in the second half of the 20th century.

In the Investigations, Wittgenstein does not present his arguments in a succinct and linear fashion; instead, he describes particular uses of language and prompts the reader to contemplate the implications of those uses. This technique gives rise to considerable dispute about both the nature of the argument and its implications. Indeed, it has become common to talk of private language arguments.

Historians of philosophy see precursors of the private language argument in a variety of sources, notably in the work of Gottlob Frege and John Locke. Locke is also a prominent exponent of the view targeted by the argument, since he proposed in his An Essay Concerning Human Understanding that the referent of a word is the idea it stands for.

== Significance ==
The private language argument is of central importance to debates about the nature of language. One compelling theory about language is that language maps words to ideas, concepts, or representations in each person's mind. On this account, the concepts in one's head are distinct from the concepts in another's head. One can match their concepts to a word in a common language, and then speak the word to another. The listener can then match the word to a concept in their mind. So the shared concepts, in effect, form a private language that one can translate into a common language and thereby share. This account is found, for example, in Locke's An Essay Concerning Human Understanding and more recently in Jerry Fodor's language of thought theory.

In his later work, Wittgenstein argues that this account of private language is inconsistent. If the idea of a private language is inconsistent, then a logical conclusion would be that all language serves a social function. This would have profound implications for other areas of philosophical and psychological study. For example, if one cannot have a private language, it might not make any sense to talk of private experiences or of private mental states.

The argument has been interpreted in a variety of ways, including but not limited to a commentary on behaviorism, a potential solution to Comte's problem regarding the impossibility of introspection, and a defence against a possible attack on the "community view" of language rules.

== Philosophical Investigations ==
The argument is found in part one of the Philosophical investigations. This part consists of a series of "remarks" numbered sequentially. The core of the argument is generally thought to be presented in §256 and onward, though the idea is first introduced in §243.

=== Definition ===
If someone were to behave as if they understood a language of which no one else can make sense, we might call this an example of a private language. It is not sufficient here, however, for the language to simply be one that has not yet been translated. In order to count as a private language in Wittgenstein's sense, it must be in principle incapable of translation into an ordinary language – if for example it were to describe those inner experiences supposed to be inaccessible to others. The private language being considered is not simply a language in fact understood by one person, but a language that in principle can only be understood by one person. So the last speaker of a dying language would not be speaking a private language, since the language remains in principle learnable. A private language must be unlearnable and untranslatable, and yet it must appear that the speaker is able to make sense of it.

=== Sensation S ===
Wittgenstein sets up a thought experiment in which someone is imagined to associate some recurrent sensation with a symbol by writing S in their calendar when the sensation occurs. Such a case would be a private language in the Wittgensteinian sense. Furthermore, it is presupposed that S cannot be defined using other terms, for example, "the feeling I get when the manometer rises"; for to do so would be to give S a place in our public language, in which case S could not be a statement in a private language.

It might be supposed that one might use "a kind of ostensive definition" for S by focusing on the sensation and on the symbol. Early in Philosophical Investigations, Wittgenstein attacks the usefulness of ostensive definition. He considers the example of someone pointing to two nuts while saying "This is called two". He considers how it comes about that the listener associates this with the number of items, rather than the type of nut, their colour, or even a compass direction. One conclusion of this is that to participate in an ostensive definition presupposes an understanding of the process and context involved, of the form of life. Another is that "an ostensive definition can be variously interpreted in every case".

In the case of the sensation S, Wittgenstein argues that no criterion exists for the correctness of such an ostensive definition, since whatever seems right will be right, and that only means that here we cannot talk about "right".' The exact reason for the rejection of private language has been contentious. One interpretation, which has been called memory scepticism, is that one might remember the sensation wrongly, and as a result one might misuse the term S. The other, called meaning scepticism, is that one can never be sure of the meaning of a term defined in this way.

=== Memory scepticism ===
One common interpretation is that the possibility exists that one might misremember the sensation, and therefore one does not have any firm criterion for using S in each case. So, for example, one might focus on one particular sensation one day and link it to the symbol S; but the next day, one would have no criteria for knowing that the sensation one has then is the same as the sensation that one had the previous day, except for one's memory; and since one's memory might fail, one has no firm criteria for knowing that the sensation one has is indeed the sensation S.

However, memory scepticism has been criticized as applying to public language, also: if one person can misremember, it is entirely possible that several people can misremember—and so memory scepticism could be applied with equal effect to ostensive definitions given in a public language. For example, Jim and Jenny might one day decide to call some particular tree T; but the next day both misremember which tree it was they named. If they were depending entirely on their memory and had not written down the location of the tree or told anyone else its location, then they would appear to have the same difficulties as the individual who defined S ostensively. And so, if this is the case, the argument presented against private language would apply equally to public language.

This interpretation (and the criticism that arises from it) has been claimed to be a misreading of Wittgenstein's original intent, however; as some defenders of Wittgenstein would have it, the argument has nothing to do with the fallibility of memory, per se, but instead concerns the intelligibility of remembering something for which there is no external criterion of correctness: i.e., it is not that we will, necessarily, misremember the sensation—but, rather, that it makes no sense to talk about our memory being either correct or incorrect in this case. The point, as Diego Marconi puts it, is not so much that private language is "a game at which we can't win," but that "it is a game we can't lose"—though critics of the argument have, in turn, sought to demonstrate that checking for correctness (as in, e.g., symbol-definition assignments) is possible in the private case as in the public.

Wittgenstein's words in §258 seem to support the aforementioned interpretation (of the argument as concerning the a priori intelligibility of the "private language" idea):

A definition surely serves to establish the meaning of a sign.—Well, that is done precisely by the concentrating of my attention; for in this way I impress on myself the connexion between the sign and the sensation.—But "I impress it on myself" can only mean: this process brings it about that I remember the connexion right in the future. But in the present case, I have no criterion of correctness.

This absence of any criterion of correctness is not a problem because it makes it more difficult for the putative private linguist to remember his or her sensation correctly; it is a problem because it undermines the intelligibility of such a concept as remembering the sensation "(in)correctly" in the first place.

Wittgenstein explains this unintelligibility with a series of analogies. For example, in §265 he observes the pointlessness of a dictionary that exists only in the imagination; since the idea of a dictionary is to provide for the translation of one word by another, and thus constitute a reference of justification for such a translation, all this is lost the moment we talk of a dictionary in the imagination—for “justification consists in appealing to something independent". Hence, to appeal to a private ostensive definition to determine the standard or correct use of a term would be "as if someone were to buy several copies of the morning paper to assure himself that what it said was true".

=== Meaning scepticism ===
Another interpretation—found, for example, in the account presented by Anthony Kenny—has it that the problem with a private ostensive definition is not just that it might be misremembered, but that such a definition cannot lead to a meaningful statement.

Let us first consider a case of ostensive definition in a public language. Jim and Jenny might one day decide to call some particular tree T, but—the next day—misremember which tree it was that they named. In this ordinary language case, it makes sense to ask questions such as "is this the tree we named T yesterday?" and make statements such as "this is not the tree we named T yesterday." So one can appeal to other parts of the form of life, perhaps arguing: "This is the only oak in the forest; T was an oak; therefore this is T."

An everyday ostensive definition is embedded in a public language, and so in the form of life in which that language occurs. Participation in a public form of life enables correction to occur. That is, in the case of a public language there are other ways to check the use of a term that has been ostensively defined. We can justify our use of the new name T by making the ostensive definition more or less explicit.

But this is not the case with S. Recall that because S is part of a private language, it is not possible to provide an explicit definition of S. The only possible definition is the private, ostensive one of associating S with that feeling. But this is the very thing being questioned. "Imagine someone saying: 'But I know how tall I am!' and laying his hand on top of his head to prove it." A coherent language game where S is consistently used is also unable to be constructed, with Wittgenstein finding this problematic as language games are essential to him for building a theory of language.

A recurrent theme in Wittgenstein's work is that for some term or utterance to have a sense, it must be conceivable that it be doubted. For Wittgenstein, tautologies do not have sense, do not say anything, and so do not admit of doubt. But furthermore, if any other sort of utterance does not admit of doubt, it must be senseless. Rush Rhees, in his notes on lectures given by Wittgenstein, while discussing the reality of physical objects, has him say:

We get something similar when we write a tautology like "p → p". We formulate such expressions to get something in which there is no doubt – even though the sense has vanished with the doubt.

As Kenny put it, "Even to think falsely that something is S, I must know the meaning of S; and this is what Wittgenstein argues is impossible in the private language." Because there is no way to check the meaning (or use) of S apart from that private ostensive act of definition, it is not possible to know what S means. The sense has vanished with the doubt.

Wittgenstein uses the further analogy of the left hand giving the right hand money. The physical act might take place, but the transaction could not count as a gift. Similarly, one might say "S" while focusing on a sensation, but no act of naming has occurred.

=== The beetle-in-a-box ===
The beetle-in-a-box is a famous thought experiment that Wittgenstein introduces in the context of his investigation of pains.

Pains occupy a distinct and vital place in the philosophy of mind for several reasons. One is that pains seem to collapse the appearance/reality distinction. If an object appears to be red it might not be so in reality, but if one seems to oneself to be in pain, it must be so: there can be no case here of seeming at all. At the same time, one cannot feel another person's pain, but only infer it from their behavior and their reports of it.

If we accept pains as special qualia known absolutely but exclusively by the solitary minds that perceive them, this may be taken to ground a Cartesian view of the self and consciousness. Our consciousness, of pains anyway, would seem unassailable. Against this, one might acknowledge the absolute fact of one's own pain but claim skepticism about the existence of anyone else's pains. Alternatively, one might take a behaviorist line and claim that our pains are merely neurological stimulations accompanied by a disposition to behave.

Wittgenstein invites readers to imagine a community in which the individuals each have a box containing a "beetle". "No one can look into anyone else's box, and everyone says he knows what a beetle is only by looking at his beetle."

If the "beetle" had a use in the language of these people, it could not be as the name of something – because it is entirely possible that each person had something completely different in their box, or even that the thing in the box constantly changed, or that each box was in fact empty. The content of the box is irrelevant to whatever language game it is used in.

By analogy, it does not matter that one cannot experience another's subjective sensations. Unless talk of such subjective experience is learned through public experience the actual content is irrelevant; all we can discuss is what is available in our public language.

By offering the "beetle" as an analogy to pains, Wittgenstein suggests that the case of pains is not really amenable to the uses philosophers would make of it. "That is to say: if we construe the grammar of the expression of sensation on the model of 'object and designation', the object drops out of consideration as irrelevant."

=== Following a rule ===
It is common to describe language use in terms of the rules that one follows, and Wittgenstein considers rules in some detail. He famously suggests that any act can be made out to follow from a given rule. He does this in setting up a dilemma:

This was our paradox: no course of action could be determined by a rule, because every course of action can be made out to accord with the rule. The answer was: if everything can be made out to accord with the rule, then it can also be made out to conflict with it. And there would be neither accord nor conflict here.

One can give an explanation of why one followed a particular rule in a particular case. But any explanation for rule following behaviour cannot be given in terms of following a rule, without involving circularity. One can say something like "She did X because of the rule R" but if you say "She followed R because of the rule R^{1}" one can then ask "but why did she follow rule R^{1}?" and so potentially become involved in a regression. Explanation must have an end.

His conclusion:

What this shows is that there is a way of grasping a rule which is not an interpretation, but which is exhibited in what we call "obeying the rule" and "going against it" in actual cases.

So following a rule is a practice. And furthermore, since one can think one is following a rule and yet be mistaken, thinking one is following a rule is not the same as following it. Therefore, following a rule cannot be a private activity.

== Kripke's interpretation ==
In 1982 Saul Kripke published a new and innovative account of the argument in his book Wittgenstein on Rules and Private Language. Kripke takes the paradox discussed in §201 to be the central problem of the Philosophical Investigations. He develops the paradox into a Grue-like problem, arguing that it similarly results in skepticism, but about meaning rather than about induction. He supposes a new form of addition, which he calls quus, which is identical with plus in all cases except those in which either of the numbers to be added is greater than 57, thus:

$$\text{x quus y}= \begin{cases} \text{x + y} & \text{for }x,y <57 \\[12pt] 5 & \text{otherwise} \end{cases}$$

He then asks if anyone could know that previously when they thought he had meant plus, he had not meant quus. He claims that his argument shows that "Each new application we make is a leap in the dark; any present intention could be interpreted to accord with anything we may choose to do. So there can be neither accord nor conflict."

Kripke's account is considered by some commentators to be unfaithful to Wittgenstein, and as a result has been referred to as "Kripkenstein". Even Kripke himself suspected that many aspects of the account were inconsistent with Wittgenstein's original intent, leading him to urge that the book "should be thought of as expounding neither 'Wittgenstein's' argument nor 'Kripke's': rather Wittgenstein's argument as it struck Kripke, as it presented a problem for him."

== See also ==
- Intrapersonal communication (i.e., "talking to oneself")
- Semantic externalism

== Notes ==
Remarks in Part I of Investigations are preceded by the symbol "§". Remarks in Part II are referenced by the relevant Roman numeral or page number in the third edition.
