= Vivid designator =

Concept in the philosophy of language

In modal logic and the philosophy of language, a vivid designator is a term which is believed to designate the same thing in all possible worlds and nothing else where such an object does not exist in a possible world. It is the analogue, in the sense of believing, of a rigid designator, which is (refers to) the same in all possible worlds, rather than just believed to be so.

== Willard Van Orman Quine ==
Willard Van Orman Quine credits David Kaplan (who in turn credits Montgomery Furth) for the term "vivid designator" in his 1977 paper "Intensions Revisited". He examines the separation between de re and de dicto and does away with de re statements, because de re statements can only work for names that are used referentially. In fact, both rigid designators and vivid designators are similarly dependent on context and empty otherwise. The same is true of the whole quantified modal logic of necessity because it collapses if essence is withdrawn.

== See also ==
- Naming and Necessity
- Rigid designator
- Non-rigid designator
- Scientific essentialism
