= Meaning and Necessity =

1947 book by Rudolf Carnap

Meaning and Necessity: A Study in Semantics and Modal Logic
- Cover of the first edition
- Author: Rudolf Carnap
- Language: English
- Series: Studies in Semantics
- Subjects: Semantics; Modal logic
- Publisher: University of Chicago Press
- Publication date: 1947
- Publication place: United States
- Media type: Print (Hardcover and Paperback)
- Pages: 258 (1964 fourth impression)
- ISBN: 978-0226093475

Meaning and Necessity: A Study in Semantics and Modal Logic (1947; enlarged edition 1956) is a book about semantics and modal logic by the philosopher Rudolf Carnap. The book, in which Carnap discusses the nature of linguistic expressions, was a continuation of his previous work in semantics in Introduction to Semantics (1942) and Formalization of Logic (1943). Considered an important discussion of semantics, it was influential and provided a basis for further developments in modal logic.

A particularly famous further development in semantics and modal logic, Saul Kripke's Naming and Necessity, is titled as a reference to Carnap's book.

== Summary ==
Carnap writes that his main purpose is the development of a new method for "the semantical analysis of meaning", which he considers synonymous with "analyzing and describing the meanings of linguistic expressions." He refers to this method as "the method of extension and intension", and explains that it is based on modification and extension of concepts such as those of class and property. He contrasts it with semantical methods that "regard an expression in a language as a name of a concrete or abstract entity", observing that unlike them, it "takes an expression, not as naming anything, but as possessing an intension and an extension." He presents Meaning and Necessity as the third volume of "Studies in Semantics", which includes previous volumes such as Introduction to Semantics. In addition to discussing meaning analysis, Carnap discusses modal logic, describing it as his second main topic.

The term "state-description" is used by Carnap to refer to a class of sentences which "contains for every atomic sentence either this sentence or its negation, but not both, and no other sentences". He considers the term justified because a state-description "obviously gives a complete description of a possible state of the universe of individuals with respect to all properties and relations expressed by predicates of the system." The enlarged edition of Meaning and Necessity includes previously published papers replying to criticism of Carnap by the philosophers Gilbert Ryle, Ernest Nagel, and Alonzo Church.

== Publication history ==
Meaning and Necessity was first published in 1947 by the University of Chicago Press. An enlarged edition was published in 1956. In 1964, a fourth impression was published.

== Reception ==
Meaning and Necessity received a positive review from Marie Hochmuth in the Quarterly Journal of Speech and a negative review from Ryle in Philosophy.

Hochmuth wrote that Carnap's work, like that of other members of the Vienna Circle, had "inspired the search for a neutral system of symbols, free from the dross of historical languages." She credited Carnap with drawing attention to "the urgent need for a system of theoretical pragmatics, not only for psychology and linguistics, but also for analytic philosophy." However, she noted that the first edition of the work had been criticized for "Carnap's claims for the simplicity and the scientific purity of his system."

Discussions of Meaning and Necessity include those by Carnap in Revue Internationale de Philosophie, the philosopher Nathan Salmon in The Philosophical Review, Bernard Linsky in History & Philosophy of Logic, Amélie Gheerbrant and Marcin Mostowski in Mathematical Logic Quarterly, and Juan José Acero in Teorema. Linsky suggested that Carnap had independently rediscovered points first made about logic by the philosopher Leon Chwistek in 1924.

The philosopher A. J. Ayer considered Meaning and Necessity more important than Carnap's other books on semantics, Introduction to Semantics and Formalization of Logic. However, he criticized the work, arguing that there is only a nominal distinction between Carnap's view that linguistic expressions have intensions and extensions and the traditional view that they "name concrete or abstract entities". He also suggested that despite Carnap's claim that every designation refers to both an intension and an extension, his system "provides only for the designation of intensional entities". The philosopher Dagfinn Føllesdal wrote that while Carnap admitted that he ignored complications with his proposed system of modal logic, he failed to explain what they were. He criticized Carnap for this, and suggested that Carnap was unaware of some of the problems with his views.

The philosopher E. J. Lowe wrote that Meaning and Necessity was "important and influential", and laid the foundations of much subsequent work in the semantics of modal logic. According to Lowe, the book was the culmination of Carnap's concern with the semantics of natural and formal languages, which developed subsequent to his publication of The Logical Syntax of Language (1934). The philosopher Henry E. Kyburg Jr. wrote that Meaning and Necessity provided the basis for a new form of modal logic. He considered Carnap's concept of the state-description one of his most important contributions.
