= Buridan formula =

Concept in modal logic

In quantified modal logic, the Buridan formula and the converse Buridan formula (more accurately, schemata rather than formulas) (i) syntactically state principles of interchange between quantifiers and modalities; (ii) semantically state a relation between domains of possible worlds. The formulas are named in honor of the medieval philosopher Jean Buridan by analogy with the Barcan formula and the converse Barcan formula introduced as axioms by Ruth Barcan Marcus.

== The Buridan formula ==
The Buridan formula is:

$$\Diamond \forall x Fx \rightarrow \forall x\Diamond  Fx$$.

In English, the schema reads: If possibly everything is F, then everything is possibly F. It is equivalent in a classical modal logic (but not necessarily in other formulations of modal logic) to

$$\exists x \Box Fx\to\Box \exists x Fx$$.

(If there exists an x that is necessarily F, then it is necessary that there exists an x that is F.)

== The converse Buridan formula ==
The converse Buridan formula is:

$\forall x\Diamond Fx \rightarrow \Diamond \forall x Fx$.

(If all x are possibly F, then it is possible that all x are F.)

Note that this formula is not valid in most of usual modal logics, and needs high orders constraints over Kripke models.

== Buridan's logic ==
... As well as providing running commentaries on Aristotle's texts, Buridan wrote particularly influential question-commentaries, a typical genre of the medieval scholastic output, in which authors systematically discussed the most problematic issues raised by the text on which they were lecturing. The question-format allowed Buridan, using the conceptual tools he developed in his works on logic, to work out in detail his characteristically nominalist take on practically all aspects of Aristotelian philosophy. Among his logical works (which also comprise a number of important question-commentaries on Aristotle's logical writings), two stand out for their originality and significance: the short Treatise on Consequences, which provides a systematic account of Buridan's theory of inferences, and the much larger Summulae de Dialectica, Buridan's monumental work covering all aspects of his logical theory.

In medieval scholasticism, nominalists held that universals exist only subsequent to particular things or pragmatic circumstances, while realists followed Plato in asserting that universals exist independently of, and superior to, particular things.

... Buridan wrote his Summulae de Dialectica, which was to become the primary textbook of nominalist logic at European universities for about two centuries, in the form of a running commentary on the enormously influential logic tract of the venerable realist master, Peter of Spain. However, for the purposes of his commentary, Buridan completely reorganized Peter's treatise, and where Peter's realist doctrine went against his own nominalism, he simply replaced Peter's text with his own.
