= Rigid designator =

Term with invariant possible designations

In modal logic and the philosophy of language, a term is a rigid designator or absolute substantial term when it designates (picks out, denotes, refers to) the same thing in all possible worlds in which that thing exists. A designator is persistently rigid if it also designates nothing in all other possible worlds. A designator is obstinately rigid if it designates the same thing in every possible world, period, whether or not that thing exists in that world. Rigid designators are contrasted with connotative terms, non-rigid or flaccid designators, which may designate different things in different possible worlds.

== History ==
The Scholastic philosophers in the Middle Ages developed a theory of properties of terms in which different classifications of concepts feature prominently.

Concepts, and the terms that signify them, can be divided into absolute or connotative, according to the mode in which they signify. If they signify something absolutely, that is, after the manner of substance, they are absolute, for example rock, lion, man, whiteness, wisdom, tallness. If they signify something connotatively, that is, with reference to a subject of inherence, i.e., after the manner of accidents, they are connotative, for example, white, wise, tall.

Both connotative and absolute concepts can be used to signify accidents, but since connotative concepts signify with a reference to a subject of inherence, they can refer to object with different definitions and properties (i.e. with different essences). For example, large, as a connotative concept, can signify objects with many distinct essences: a man, a lion, a triangle can be large.

On the other hand, absolute concepts signify objects that have the same definitions and properties. For example, the concept of gold, as an absolute concept, can signify only objects with the same definitions and properties (i.e. with the same essence).

== Proper names and definite descriptions ==
The notion of absolute concepts was then revived by Saul Kripke, with the name “rigid designation”, in the lectures that became Naming and Necessity, in the course of his argument against descriptivist theories of reference, building on the work of Ruth Barcan Marcus. At the time of Kripke's lectures, the dominant theory of reference in analytic philosophy (associated with the theories of Gottlob Frege and Bertrand Russell) was that the meaning of sentences involving proper names could be given by substituting a contextually appropriate description for the name. Russell, for example, famously held that someone who had never met Otto von Bismarck might know of him as the first Chancellor of the German Empire, and if so, his statement that (say) "Bismarck was a ruthless politician" should be understood to mean "The first Chancellor of the German Empire was a ruthless politician" (which could in turn be analysed into a series of more basic statements according to the method Russell introduced in his theory of definite descriptions). Kripke argued—against both the Russellian analysis and several attempted refinements of it—that such descriptions could not possibly mean the same thing as the name "Bismarck," on the grounds that proper names such as "Bismarck" always designate rigidly, whereas descriptions such as "the first Chancellor of the German Empire" do not. Thus, for example, it might have been the case that Bismarck died in infancy. If so, he would not have ever satisfied the description "the first Chancellor of the German Empire," and (indeed) someone else probably would have. It does not follow that the first Chancellor of the German Empire may not have been the first Chancellor of the German Empire—that is (at least according to its surface-structure) a contradiction. Kripke argues that the way that proper names work is that when we make statements about what might or might not have been true of Bismarck, we are talking about what might or might not have been true of that particular person in various situations, whereas when we make statements about what might or might not have been true of, say, the first Chancellor of the German Empire we could be talking about what might or might not have been true of whoever would have happened to fill that office in those situations.

The "could" here is important to note: rigid designation is a property of the way terms are used, not a property of the terms themselves, and some philosophers, following Keith Donnellan, have argued that a phrase such as "the first Chancellor of the German Empire" could be used rigidly, in sentences such as "the first Chancellor of the German Empire could have decided never to go into politics." Kripke himself doubted that there was any need to recognize rigid uses of definite descriptions, and argued that Russell's notion of scope offered all that was needed to account for such sentences. But in either case, Kripke argued, nothing important in his account depends on the question. Whether definite descriptions can be used rigidly or not, they can at least sometimes be used non-rigidly, but a proper name can only be used rigidly; the asymmetry, Kripke argues, demonstrates that no definite description could give the meaning of a proper name—although it might be used to explain who a name refers to (that is, to "fix the referent" of the name).

== Essentialism ==
In Naming and Necessity, Kripke argues that proper names and certain natural kind terms—including biological taxa and types of natural substances (most famously, "water" and "H_{2}O") designate rigidly. He argues for a form of scientific essentialism not unlike Aristotelian essentialism. Essential properties are common to an object in all possible worlds, and so they pick out the same objects in all possible worlds - they rigidly designate.

== Causal-historical theory of reference ==
Proper names rigidly designate for reasons that differ from natural kinds terms. The reason 'Johnny Depp' refers to one particular person in all possible worlds is because some person initially gave the name to him by saying something like "Let's call our baby 'Johnny Depp'". This is called the initial baptism. This usage of 'Johnny Depp' for referring to some particular baby got passed on from person-to-person in a giant causal and historical chain of events. That is why everybody calls Johnny Depp 'Johnny Depp'. Johnny's mother passed it onto her friends who passed it onto their friends who passed it onto their friends, and so on.

== Necessary identities ==
One puzzling consequence of Kripke semantics is that identities involving rigid designators are necessary. If water is H_{2}O, then water is necessarily H_{2}O. Since the terms 'water' and 'H_{2}O' pick out the same object in every possible world, there is no possible world in which 'water' picks out something different from 'H_{2}O'. Therefore, water is necessarily H_{2}O. It is possible, of course, that we are mistaken about the chemical composition of water, but that does not affect the necessity of identities. What is not being claimed is that water is necessarily H_{2}O, but conditionally, if water is H_{2}O (though we may not know this, it does not change the fact if it is true), then water is necessarily H_{2}O.

== See also ==
- Causal theory of reference
- Class versus instance
- Counterpart theory
- Direct reference theory
- Non-rigid designator
- Vivid designator
- Scientific essentialism
- A posteriori necessity
