= Philosophical Investigations =

1953 work by Ludwig Wittgenstein

- Cover of the first English edition
- Author: Ludwig Wittgenstein
- Original title: Philosophische Untersuchungen
- Translator: G. E. M. Anscombe
- Language: German
- Subject: Ordinary language philosophy
- Publication date: 1953
- Media type: Print (hardcover and paperback)
- OCLC: 954131267

Philosophical Investigations (German: Philosophische Untersuchungen) is a work by the philosopher Ludwig Wittgenstein, published posthumously in 1953.

Philosophical Investigations is divided into two parts, consisting of what Wittgenstein calls, in the preface, Bemerkungen, translated by G. E. M. Anscombe as "remarks". (Note: Remarks in Part I of Investigations are preceded by the symbol "§". Remarks in Part II are referenced by their Roman numeral or their page number in the third edition.)

A survey among American university and college teachers ranked the Investigations as the most important book of 20th-century philosophy.

== Relation to Wittgenstein's body of work ==
In its preface, Wittgenstein says that Philosophical Investigations can "be seen in the right light only by contrast with and against the background of my older way of thinking". Wittgenstein's biographer Ray Monk writes, "This is partly because of the great differences between his early and late work, but also because of the equally important continuities between the two". The early work in which Wittgenstein expressed his "older way of thinking" is the only book Wittgenstein published in his lifetime, the Tractatus Logico-Philosophicus.

The Blue and Brown Books, a set of notes dictated to his class at Cambridge in 1933–1934, contain the seeds of Wittgenstein's later thoughts on language and are widely read as a turning point in his philosophy of language—"as an early prototype for subsequent presentations of Wittgenstein's later philosophy".

The American philosopher Norman Malcolm credits Piero Sraffa with helping Wittgenstein's break away from the notion that a proposition must literally function as a picture of reality. According to Malcolm, this shift was prompted by a rude gesture from Sraffa, who then asked Wittgenstein, "What is the logical form of that?" In the Introduction to Philosophical Investigations, written in 1945, Wittgenstein acknowledged the "criticism" that Sraffa "for many years unceasingly applied to my thoughts. It is to this stimulus that I owe the most fruitful ideas of this book."

== Content ==
The book begins with a quotation from Johann Nestroy's play Der Schützling: "The trouble about progress is that it always looks much greater than it really is" (translation from revised fourth edition).

=== Language games ===
Wittgenstein first mentions games in section 3 of Philosophical Investigations and then develops this discussion of games into the key notion of a language game. Wittgenstein's use of the term language game "is meant to bring into prominence the fact that the speaking of language is part of an activity, or of a life-form". A central feature of language games is that language is used in a context and cannot be understood outside of that context. Wittgenstein lists the following as examples of language games: "Giving orders, and obeying them"; "describing the appearance of an object, or giving its measurements"; "constructing an object from a description (a drawing)"; "reporting an event"; "speculating about an event". The famous example is the meaning of the word "game". We speak of various kinds of games: board games, betting games, sports, and "war games". These are all different uses of the word "games". Wittgenstein also gives the example of "Water!", which can be used as an exclamation, an order, a request, or an answer to a question. The meaning of the word depends on the language game in which it is used. Another way Wittgenstein makes the point is that the word "water" has no meaning apart from its use within a language game. One might use the word as an order to have someone else bring you a glass of water. But it can also be used to warn someone that the water has been poisoned.

Wittgenstein applies his concept of language games not only to word meaning but also to sentence meaning. For example, the sentence "Moses did not exist" (§ 79) can mean various things. Wittgenstein argues that, independent of use, the sentence does not yet "say" anything. It is "meaningless" in the sense of not being significant for a particular purpose. It acquires significance only if we use it within a context; the sentence by itself does not determine its meaning but becomes meaningful only when it is used to say something. For instance, it can be used to say that no person or historical figure fits the descriptions attributed to the person who goes by the name of "Moses". But it can also mean that the leader of the Israelites was not called Moses. Or that there cannot have been anyone who accomplished all that the Bible relates about Moses, etc. What the sentence means depends on its use in a context.

=== Meaning as use ===
The Investigations deal largely with the difficulties of language and meaning. Wittgenstein viewed the tools of language as being utterly simple (Note: § 97 quotation: the order of possibilities, which must be common to both world and thought ... must be utterly simple.), and he believed that philosophers had obscured this simplicity by misusing language and by asking meaningless questions. He attempted in the Investigations to make things clear: Der Fliege den Ausweg aus dem Fliegenglas zeigen—to show the fly the way out of the fly bottle.

Wittgenstein claims that the meaning of a word is based on how the word is understood within the language game. A common summary of his argument is that meaning is use. According to the use theory of meaning, the words are not defined by reference to the objects they designate or by the mental representations one might associate with them, but by how they are used. For example, this means there is no need to postulate that there is something called good that exists independently of any good deed. Wittgenstein's theory of meaning contrasts with Platonic realism and with Gottlob Frege's notions of sense and reference. This argument has been labelled by some authors as "anthropological holism".

Section 43 in Wittgenstein's Philosophical Investigations reads: "For a large class of cases—though not for all—in which we employ the word 'meaning,' it can be defined thus: the meaning of a word is its use in the language."

Wittgenstein begins Philosophical Investigations with a quote from Augustine's Confessions, which represents the view that language serves to point out objects in the world; this is the view that he will be criticising.

The individual words in a language name objects—sentences are combinations of such names. In this picture of language, we find the roots of the following idea: Every word has a meaning. This meaning is correlated with the word. It is the object for which the word stands.

Wittgenstein rejects a variety of ways of thinking about what the meaning of a word is or how meanings can be identified. He shows how, in each case, the meaning of the word presupposes our ability to use it. He first asks the reader to perform a thought experiment: come up with a definition of the word game. While this may at first seem like a simple task, he then leads us through the problems with each of the possible definitions of the word game. Any definition that focuses on amusement leaves us unsatisfied, since the feelings experienced by a world-class chess player are very different from those of a circle of children playing duck, duck, goose. Any definition that focuses on competition will fail to explain the game of catch, or the game of solitaire. And a definition of the word game that focuses on rules will face similar difficulties.

The essential point of this exercise is often missed. Wittgenstein's point is not that it is impossible to define game, but that "even if we don't have a definition, we can still use the word successfully". Everybody understands what we mean when we talk about playing a game, and we can even clearly identify and correct inaccurate uses of the word, all without reference to any definition that consists of necessary and sufficient conditions for the application of the concept of a game. The German word for game, Spiele / Spiel, has a different sense from the English; the meaning of Spiele also extends to the concept of play and playing. This German sense of the word may help readers better understand Wittgenstein's remarks regarding games.

Wittgenstein argues that definitions emerge from what he termed forms of life, roughly the culture and society in which they are used. Wittgenstein stresses the social aspects of cognition; to see how language works in most cases, we have to see how it functions in a specific social situation. It is this emphasis on becoming attentive to the social backdrop against which language is rendered intelligible that explains Wittgenstein's elliptical comment that "If a lion could talk, we could not understand him." However, in proposing the thought experiment involving the fictional character Robinson Crusoe, a captain shipwrecked on a desolate island with no other inhabitant, Wittgenstein shows that language is not in all cases a social phenomenon (although it is in most cases); instead, the criterion for a language is grounded in a set of interrelated normative activities: teaching, explanations, techniques, and criteria of correctness. In short, it is essential that a language be shareable, but this does not imply that for a language to function, it must be shared.

Wittgenstein rejects the idea that ostensive definitions can provide us with the meaning of a word. For Wittgenstein, the thing that the word stands for does not give the meaning of the word. Wittgenstein argues for this by making a series of moves to show that understanding an ostensive definition presupposes an understanding of the way the word being defined is used. So, for instance, there is no difference between pointing to a piece of paper, to its colour, or to its shape, but understanding the difference is crucial to using the paper in an ostensive definition of a shape or of a colour.

=== Family resemblances ===
Why is it that we are sure a particular activity (e.g. Olympic target shooting) is a game while a similar activity (e.g. military sharpshooting) is not? Wittgenstein's explanation is tied up with an important analogy. How do we recognise that two people we know are related to one another? We may see similar height, weight, eye colour, hair, nose, mouth, patterns of speech, social or political views, mannerisms, body structure, last names, etc. If we see enough similarities we say we've noticed a family resemblance. This is not always a conscious process—generally we don't catalogue various similarities until we reach a certain threshold; we just intuitively see the resemblances. Wittgenstein suggests that the same is true of language. We are all familiar with enough things that are games and enough things that are not games that we can categorise new activities as either games or not.

This brings us back to Wittgenstein's reliance on indirect communication and on thought-experiments. Some philosophical confusions come about because we aren't able to see family resemblances. We've made a mistake in understanding the vague and intuitive rules that language uses and have thereby tied ourselves up in philosophical knots. He suggests that an attempt to untangle these knots requires more than simple deductive arguments pointing out the problems with some particular position. Instead, Wittgenstein's larger goal is to try to divert us from our philosophical problems long enough to become aware of our intuitive ability to see the family resemblances.

=== Rules and rule-following ===
Wittgenstein's discussion of rules and rule-following takes place in §§ 138–242. Wittgenstein begins his discussion of rules with the example of one person giving orders to another "to write down a series of signs according to a certain formation rule". The series of signs consists of the natural numbers. Wittgenstein draws a distinction between following orders by copying the numbers following instruction and understanding the construction of the series of numbers. One general characteristic of games that Wittgenstein considers in detail is the way in which they consist in following rules. Rules constitute a family, rather than a class that can be explicitly defined. As a consequence, it is not possible to provide a definitive account of what it is to follow a rule. Indeed, he argues that any course of action can be made out to accord with some particular rule, and that therefore a rule cannot be used to explain an action. Rather, that one is following a rule or not is to be decided by looking to see if the actions conform to the expectations in the particular form of life in which one is involved. Following a rule is a social activity.

Saul Kripke provides an influential discussion of Wittgenstein's remarks on rules. For Kripke, Wittgenstein's discussion of rules "may be regarded as a new form of philosophical scepticism". He starts his discussion of Wittgenstein by quoting what he describes as Wittgenstein's sceptical paradox: "This was our paradox: no course of action could be determined by a rule, because every course of action can be made out to accord with the rule. The answer was: if everything can be made out to accord with the rule, then it can also be made out to conflict with it. And so there would be neither accord nor conflict here." Kripke argues that the implications of Wittgenstein's discussion of rules is that no person can mean something by the language that they use or correctly follow (or fail to follow) a rule. In his 1984 book, Wittgenstein on Meaning, Colin McGinn disputed Kripke's interpretation.

=== Private language ===
Wittgenstein also ponders the possibility of a language that talks about those things that are known only to the user, whose content is inherently private. The usual example is that of a language in which one names one's sensations and other subjective experiences, such that the meaning of the term is decided by the individual alone. For example, the individual names a particular sensation, on some occasion, S, and intends to use that word to refer to that sensation. Such a language Wittgenstein calls a private language.

Wittgenstein presents several perspectives on the topic. One point he makes is that it is incoherent to talk of knowing that one is in some particular mental state. Whereas others can learn of my pain, for example, I simply have my own pain; it follows that one does not know of one's own pain, one simply has a pain. For Wittgenstein, this is a grammatical point, part of the way in which the language game involving the word pain is played.

Although Wittgenstein certainly argues that the notion of private language is incoherent, because of the way in which the text is presented the exact nature of the argument is disputed. First, he argues that a private language is not really a language at all. This point is intimately connected with a variety of other themes in his later works, especially his investigations of "meaning". For Wittgenstein, there is no single, coherent "sample" or "object" that we can call "meaning". Rather, the supposition that there are such things is the source of many philosophical confusions. Meaning is a complicated phenomenon that is woven into the fabric of our lives. A good first approximation of Wittgenstein's point is that meaning is a social event; meaning happens between language users. As a consequence, it makes no sense to talk about a private language, with words that mean something in the absence of other users of the language.

Wittgenstein also argues that one couldn't possibly use the words of a private language. He invites the reader to consider a case in which someone decides that each time she has a particular sensation she will place a sign S in a diary. Wittgenstein points out that in such a case one could have no criteria for the correctness of one's use of S. Again, several examples are considered. One is that perhaps using S involves mentally consulting a table of sensations, to check that one has associated S correctly; but in this case, how could the mental table be checked for its correctness? It is "[a]s if someone were to buy several copies of the morning paper to assure himself that what it said was true", as Wittgenstein puts it. One common interpretation of the argument is that while one may have direct or privileged access to one's current mental states, there is no such infallible access to identifying previous mental states that one had in the past. That is, the only way to check to see if one has applied the symbol S correctly to a certain mental state is to introspect and determine whether the current sensation is identical to the sensation previously associated with S. And while identifying one's current mental state of remembering may be infallible, whether one remembered correctly is not infallible. Thus, for a language to be used at all it must have some public criterion of identity.

Often, what is widely regarded as a deep philosophical problem will vanish, argues Wittgenstein, and eventually be seen as a confusion about the significance of the words that philosophers use to frame such problems and questions. It is only in this way that it is interesting to talk about something like a "private language" – i.e., it is helpful to see how the "problem" results from a misunderstanding.

In summary, Wittgenstein asserts that if something is a language, it cannot be logically private; and if something is private, it is not (and cannot be) a language.

=== Wittgenstein's beetle ===
Another point that Wittgenstein makes against the possibility of a private language involves the beetle-in-a-box thought experiment. He asks the reader to imagine that each person has a box, inside which is something that everyone intends to refer to with the word beetle. Further, suppose that no one can look inside another's box, and each claims to know what a "beetle" is only by examining their own box. Wittgenstein suggests that, in such a situation, the word beetle could not be the name of a thing, because supposing that each person has something completely different in their boxes (or nothing at all) does not change the meaning of the word; the beetle as a private object "drops out of consideration as irrelevant". Thus, Wittgenstein argues, if we can talk about something, then it is not "private" in the sense considered. And, contrapositively, if we consider something to be indeed private, it follows that we "cannot talk about it".

=== Mind ===
Wittgenstein's investigations of language lead to several issues concerning the mind. His key target of criticism is any form of extreme mentalism that posits mental states that are entirely unconnected to the subject's environment. For Wittgenstein, thought is inevitably tied to language, which is inherently social. Part of Wittgenstein's credo is captured in the following proclamation: "An 'inner process' stands in need of outward criteria." This follows primarily from his conclusions about private languages: a private mental state (a sensation of pain, for example) cannot be adequately discussed without public criteria for identifying it.

According to Wittgenstein, those who insist that consciousness (or any other apparently subjective mental state) is conceptually unconnected to the external world are mistaken. Wittgenstein explicitly criticises so-called conceivability arguments: "Could one imagine a stone's having consciousness? And if anyone can do so—why should that not merely prove that such image-mongery is of no interest to us?" He considers and rejects the following reply as well:

But if I suppose that someone is in pain, then I am simply supposing that he has just the same as I have so often had. – That gets us no further. It is as if I were to say: "You surely know what 'It is 5 o'clock here' means; so you also know what 'It's 5 o'clock on the sun' means. It means simply that it is just the same there as it is here when it is 5 o'clock." – The explanation by means of identity does not work here.

Thus, according to Wittgenstein, mental states are intimately connected to a subject's environment, especially to his or her linguistic environment, and conceivability or imaginability. Arguments that claim otherwise are misguided.

=== Seeing that vs. seeing as ===
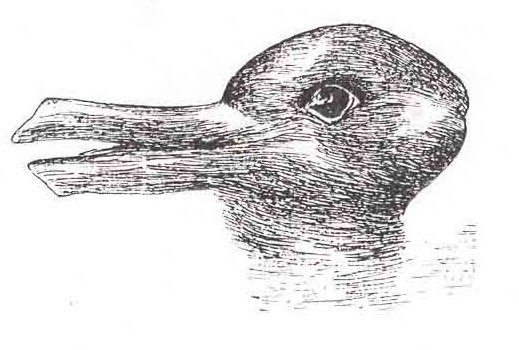
The duck-rabbit illusion became famous when Wittgenstein used it to distinguish "seeing that" from "seeing as".

In addition to ambiguous sentences, Wittgenstein discussed figures that can be seen and understood in two different ways. Often one can see something in a straightforward way – seeing that it is a rabbit, perhaps. But, at other times, one notices a particular aspect – seeing it as something.

An example Wittgenstein uses is the "duck-rabbit", an ambiguous image that can be seen as either a duck or a rabbit. When one looks at the duck-rabbit and sees a rabbit, one is not interpreting the picture as a rabbit, but rather reporting what one sees. One just sees the picture as a rabbit. But what occurs when one sees it first as a duck, then as a rabbit? As the gnomic remarks in the Investigations indicate, Wittgenstein isn't sure. However, he is sure that it could not be the case that the external world stays the same while an "internal" cognitive change takes place.

== Response and influence ==
In a 1999 poll of philosophers by the journal Philosophical Forum, the Philosophical Investigations was the most named work in response to the prompt to name the top five most important books in 20th century philosophy.

Bertrand Russell in his book My Philosophical Development, wrote that "I have not found in Wittgenstein's Philosophical Investigations anything that seemed to me interesting and I do not understand why a whole school finds important wisdom in its pages."

In his book Words and Things, Ernest Gellner was fiercely critical of the work of Ludwig Wittgenstein, J. L. Austin, Gilbert Ryle, Antony Flew, P. F. Strawson and many others. Ryle refused to have the book reviewed in the philosophical journal Mind (which he edited), and Bertrand Russell (who had written an approving foreword) protested in a letter to The Times. A response from Ryle and a lengthy correspondence ensued.

The first English translation of Karl Rahner's Schriften zur Theologie was named Theological Investigations; this title choice was by a translator and former student of Wittgenstein's, the theologian Cornelius Ernst, as a homage to the book.

In addition to stressing the differences between the Investigations and the Tractatus, some critical approaches have claimed there to be more continuity and similarity between the two works than many suppose. One of these is the New Wittgenstein approach.

=== Kripkenstein ===
The discussion of private languages was revitalised in 1982 with the publication of Kripke's book Wittgenstein on Rules and Private Language. In this work, Kripke uses Wittgenstein's text to develop a particular type of scepticism about rules that stresses the communal nature of language-use as grounding meaning. Critics of Kripke's version of Wittgenstein have facetiously referred to it as "Kripkenstein", with scholars such as Gordon Baker, Peter Hacker, Colin McGinn, and John McDowell seeing it as a radical misinterpretation of Wittgenstein's text. Other philosophers – such as Martin Kusch – have defended Kripke's views.

=== Popular culture ===
The album, The Rose Has Teeth in the Mouth of a Beast and its title track "Roses and Teeth for Ludwig Wittgenstein", by electronic duo Matmos is named after a quote from the book. Steve Reich's song, "You Are (Variations)", also contain a quote from the book: "Explanations come to an end somewhere".

== Editions ==
Philosophical Investigations was not ready for publication when Wittgenstein died in 1951. G. E. M. Anscombe translated Wittgenstein's manuscript into English, and it was first published in 1953. There are multiple editions of Philosophical Investigations with the popular third edition and 50th anniversary edition having been edited by Anscombe:

- First Edition: Blackwell Publishers 1953. (ISBN 9780631103202) German-English Edition, translation by G. E. M. Anscombe.
- Second Edition: Blackwell Publishers, 1958.
- Third Edition: Prentice Hall, 1973 (ISBN 0-02-428810-1).
- 50th Anniversary Edition: Blackwell Publishers, 2001 (ISBN 0-631-23127-7). This edition includes the original German text in addition to the English translation.
- Fourth Edition: Wiley-Blackwell, 2009 (ISBN 978-1-4051-5928-9). This edition includes the original German text in addition to the English translation. (Note: The first two editions (1953 and 1958) were Anscombe's text; in the anniversary edition (2001), P. M. S. Hacker and Joachim Schulte are also credited as translators. The fourth edition (2009) was presented as a revision by Hacker and Schulte, crediting Anscombe, Hacker, and Schulte as translators.)

== See also ==
- Prior's tonk

== Sources ==
- Wittgenstein, Ludwig (2001) [1953]. Philosophical Investigations. Blackwell Publishing. ISBN 0-631-23127-7.
- Kripke, Saul (1982). Wittgenstein on Rules and Private Language. Basil Blackwell Publishing. ISBN 0-631-13521-9.
