= Non-rigid designator =

Term used in Philosophy of Language & Modal Logic

In the philosophy of language and modal logic, a term is said to be a non-rigid designator (or flaccid designator) or connotative term if it does not extensionally designate (denote, refer to) the same object in all possible worlds. This is in contrast to a rigid designator, which does designate the same object in all possible worlds in which that object exists, and does not designate anything else in those worlds in which that object does not exist. The term was coined by Saul Kripke in his 1970 lecture series at Princeton University, later published as the book Naming and Necessity.

== Examples ==
As an example, consider the phrase "The 43rd President of the United States of America": while the 43rd President of the United States is actually George W. Bush, things might have been different. Bush might have lost the election, meaning that the 43rd President might have been Al Gore or Ralph Nader instead. (How remote these possible worlds are from the actual world is a discussion for physics and counterfactualism.) "The 43rd President of the United States of America" is thus a non-rigid designator, picking out George W. Bush in some possible worlds, Al Gore in others, and yet other people in other worlds.

Non-rigid designators are defined by contrast with Kripke's notion of a rigid designator, which picks out the same thing uniquely in every possible world; while there are possible worlds in which the 43rd President of the United States is Al Gore instead of George W. Bush, there are no possible worlds where George W. Bush is anyone other than the man who, in fact, he is. (There are worlds where some person other than George W. Bush is named "George W. Bush," but that's neither here nor there.) Kripke uses this apparent asymmetry to argue (in Naming and Necessity) that no definite description can be the meaning of a proper name, because names must always be rigid designators, while definite descriptions can designate non-rigidly.

== Criticism ==
Some philosophers, such as Gareth Evans, have expressed doubt as to whether non-rigid expressions ought to be called designators at all.
