= Wittgenstein on Rules and Private Language =

1982 exegesis by Saul Kripke

- Author: Saul A. Kripke
- Language: English
- Subjects: Philosophy of language
- Publisher: Harvard University Press
- Publication date: 1982
- Publication place: United States
- Pages: 150
- ISBN: 0-674-95401-7

Wittgenstein on Rules and Private Language is a 1982 book by philosopher of language Saul Kripke in which he contends that the central argument of Ludwig Wittgenstein's Philosophical Investigations centers on a skeptical rule-following paradox that undermines the possibility of our ever following rules in our use of language. Kripke writes that this paradox is "the most radical and original skeptical problem that philosophy has seen to date" (p. 60). He argues that Wittgenstein does not reject the argument that leads to the rule-following paradox, but accepts it and offers a "skeptical solution" to alleviate the paradox's destructive effects.

== Kripkenstein: Kripke's skeptical Wittgenstein ==
While most commentators accept that the Philosophical Investigations contains the rule-following paradox as Kripke presents it, few have concurred in attributing Kripke's skeptical solution to Wittgenstein. Kripke expresses doubts in Wittgenstein on Rules and Private Language as to whether Wittgenstein would endorse his interpretation of the Philosophical Investigations. He says that his book should not be read as an attempt to give an accurate summary of Wittgenstein's views, but rather as an account of Wittgenstein's argument "as it struck Kripke, as it presented a problem for him" (p. 5). The portmanteau "Kripkenstein" has been coined as a term for a fictional person who holds the views expressed by Kripke's reading of the Philosophical Investigations; in this way, it is convenient to speak of Kripke's own views, Wittgenstein's views (as generally understood), and Kripkenstein's views. Wittgenstein scholar David G. Stern considers Kripke's book the most influential and widely discussed work on Wittgenstein from the 1980s onward.

== The rule-following paradox ==
In Philosophical Investigations §201a Wittgenstein states the rule-following paradox: "This was our paradox: no course of action could be determined by a rule, because any course of action can be made out to accord with the rule".

Kripke gives a mathematical example to illustrate the reasoning that leads to this conclusion. Suppose that you have never added numbers greater than or equal to 57 before. Further, suppose that you are asked to perform the computation 68 + 57. Our natural inclination is that you will apply the addition function as you have before, and calculate that the correct answer is 125. But now imagine that a bizarre skeptic comes along and argues:

1. That there is no fact about your past usage of the addition function that determines 125 as the right answer.
2. That nothing justifies you in giving this answer rather than another.

After all, the skeptic reasons, by hypothesis you have never added numbers 57 or greater before. It is perfectly consistent with your previous use of "plus" that you actually meant "quus", defined as:

$$x\text{ quus }y= \begin{cases} x+y & \text{for }x,y <57 \\[12pt] 5 & \text{for } x\ge 57 \text{  or  } y\ge57 \end{cases}$$

Thus under the quus function, if either of the two numbers added is 57 or greater, the sum is 5. The skeptic argues that there is no fact that determines that you ought to answer 125 rather than 5, as all your prior addition is compatible with the quus function instead of the plus function, for you have never added a number greater than or equal to 57 before.

Further, your past usage of the addition function is susceptible to an infinite number of different quus-like interpretations. It appears that every new application of "plus", rather than being governed by a strict, unambiguous rule, is actually a leap in the dark.

Similar skeptical reasoning can be applied to the meaning of any word of any human language. The power of Kripke's example is that in mathematics the rules for the use of expressions appear to be defined clearly for an infinite number of cases. Kripke doesn't question the mathematical validity of the "+" function, but rather the meta-linguistic usage of "plus": what fact can we point to that shows that "plus" refers to the mathematical function "+"?

If we assume for the sake of argument that "plus" refers to the function "+", the skeptical problem simply resurfaces at a higher level. The addition algorithm itself will contain terms susceptible to different and incompatible interpretations. In short, rules for interpreting rules provide no help, because they themselves can be interpreted in different ways. Or, as Wittgenstein puts it, "any interpretation still hangs in the air along with what it interprets, and cannot give it any support. Interpretations by themselves do not determine meaning" (Philosophical Investigations §198a).

== The skeptical solution ==
Following David Hume, Kripke distinguishes between two types of solution to skeptical paradoxes. Straight solutions dissolve paradoxes by rejecting one (or more) of the premises that lead to them. Skeptical solutions accept the truth of the paradox, but argue that it does not undermine our ordinary beliefs and practices in the way it seems to. Because Kripke thinks that Wittgenstein endorses the skeptical paradox, he is committed to the view that Wittgenstein offers a skeptical, and not a straight, solution.

The rule-following paradox threatens our ordinary beliefs and practices concerning meaning because it implies that there is no such thing as meaning something by an expression or sentence. John McDowell explains this as follows. We are inclined to think of meaning in contractual terms: that is, that meanings commit or oblige us to use words in a certain way. When you grasp the meaning of the word "dog", for example, you know that you ought to use that word to refer to dogs, and not cats. But if there cannot be rules governing the uses of words, as the rule-following paradox apparently shows, this intuitive notion of meaning is utterly undermined.

Kripke holds that other commentators on Philosophical Investigations have believed that the private language argument is presented in sections occurring after §243. Kripke reacts against this view, noting that the conclusion to the argument is explicitly stated by §202, which reads “Hence it is not possible to obey a rule ‘privately’: otherwise thinking one was obeying a rule would be the same as obeying it.” Further, in this introductory section, Kripke identifies Wittgenstein's interests in the philosophy of mind as related to his interests in the foundations of mathematics, in that both subjects require considerations about rules and rule-following.

Kripke's skeptical solution is this: A language-user's following a rule correctly is not justified by any fact that obtains about the relationship between their candidate application of a rule in a particular case and the putative rule itself (as for Hume the causal link between two events a and b is not determined by any particular fact obtaining between them taken in isolation); rather, the assertion that the rule that is being followed is justified by the fact that the behaviors surrounding the candidate instance of rule-following (by the candidate rule-follower) meet other language users' expectations. That the solution is not based on a fact about a particular instance of putative rule-following—as it would be if it were based on some mental state of meaning, interpretation, or intention—shows that this solution is skeptical in the sense Kripke specifies.

== The "straight" solution ==
In contrast to the kind of solution offered by Kripke (above) and Crispin Wright (elsewhere), McDowell interprets Wittgenstein as correctly (by McDowell's lights) offering a "straight solution". McDowell argues that Wittgenstein does present the paradox (as Kripke argues), but he argues further that Wittgenstein rejects the paradox on the grounds that it assimilates understanding and interpretation. In order to understand something, we must have an interpretation. That is, to understand what is meant by "plus", we must first have an interpretation of what "plus" means. This leads one to either skepticism—how do you know your interpretation is the correct interpretation?—or relativity, whereby our understandings, and thus interpretations, are only so determined insofar as we have used them. On this latter view, endorsed by Wittgenstein in Wright's readings, there are no facts about numerical addition that we have so far not discovered, so when we come upon such situations, we can flesh out our interpretations further. According to McDowell, both of these alternatives are rather unsatisfying, the latter because we want to say that there are facts about numbers that have not yet been added.

McDowell further writes that to understand rule-following we should understand it as resulting from inculcation into a custom or practice. Thus, to understand addition is simply to have been inculcated into a practice of adding. This position is often called "anti-antirealism", meaning that he argues that the result of sceptical arguments, like that of the rule-following paradox, is to tempt philosophical theory into realism, thereby making bold metaphysical claims. Since McDowell offers a straight solution, making the rule-following paradox compatible with realism would be missing Wittgenstein's basic point that the meaning can often be said to be the use. This is in line with quietism, the view that philosophical theory results only in dichotomies and that the notion of a theory of meaning is pointless.

== Semantic realism and Kripkenstein ==
George M. Wilson argues that there is a way to lay out Kripkenstein as a philosophical position compatible with semantic realism: by differentiating between two sorts of conclusions resulting from the rule-following paradox, illustrated by a speaker S using a term T:

BSC (Basic Sceptical Conclusion): There are no facts about S that fix any set of properties as the standard of correctness for S's use of T.

RSC (Radical Sceptical Conclusion): No one ever means anything by any term.

Wilson argues that Kripke's sceptic is indeed committed to RSC, but that Kripke reads Wittgenstein as embracing BSC but refuting RSC. This, Wilson argues, is done with the concept of familiarity. When S uses T, its correctness is determined neither by a fact about S (hereby accepting the rule-following paradox) nor a correspondence between T and the object termed (hereby denying the idea of correspondence theory), but the irreducible fact that T is grounded in familiarity, being used to predicate other similar objects. This familiarity is independent of and, in some sense, external to S, making familiarity the grounding for semantic realism.

Still, Wilson's suggested realism is minimal, partly accepting McDowell's critique.

== See also ==
- New riddle of induction
