= Quentin Smith =

American philosopher (1952–2020)

Quentin Persifor Smith (August 27, 1952, Rhinebeck, New York – November 12, 2020, Kalamazoo, Michigan) was an American philosopher. He was professor emeritus of philosophy at Western Michigan University in Kalamazoo, Michigan. He worked in the philosophy of time, philosophy of language, philosophy of physics and philosophy of religion.

Smith published over 140 articles. Of his published books, he authored three, co-authored two, and co-authored and edited seven. He was an editor for Prometheus Books and was the chief editor for Philo from 2001 to 2007. He debated William Lane Craig over the existence of God.

== Early life and education ==
Quentin Smith was born in Rhinebeck, New York. His father was a psychology professor at Bennington College and he spent most of his early life in Canada.

He received his bachelor's degree in philosophy from Antioch College, advancing to receive a PhD in philosophy from Boston College.

== Career ==
After college, he received a job as assistant professor of philosophy at the University of Kentucky. Smith found that he could not afford to lose the time he spent teaching, so he resigned from the university to become an independent scholar.

After accepting a position as a visiting professor at Antioch College, he took a position as professor of philosophy at Western Michigan University in 1993 and retired in 2015.

== Philosophical work ==
Smith worked in a wide range of disciplines.

In the philosophy of language, he identified the theory of proper names of Ruth Barcan Marcus with the theory of reference given in Saul Kripke's Naming and Necessity, an identification that had influence until the broad community recognised the fundamental difference in their accounts.

In the philosophy of religion; he was considered a leading defender of Atheism and was responsible for pioneering many different arguments against the existence of God from Quantum Cosmology, General Relativity, Big Bang Cosmology, Evil Natural Laws, and Hartle-Hawking Cosmology. He engaged in many debates with leading theists such as William Lane Craig and Alvin Plantinga.

== Death ==
Smith died on November 12, 2020.

== Published works ==
- Epistemology: New Essays (Editor) Oxford: Oxford University Press, 2008. ISBN 0-19-926494-5
- Einstein, Relativity and Absolute Simultaneity. (co-edited with William Lane Craig). New York: Routledge, 2007. ISBN 978-0-415-70174-7
- Time, Tense and Reference (co-edited with A. Jokic, and contributing author). Cambridge MA: MIT Press, October 2003. ISBN 0-262-10098-3
- Consciousness: New Philosophical Perspectives (co-edited with A. Jokic, and contributing author). Oxford: Oxford University Press, January 2003. ISBN 0-19-924129-5
- Ethical and Religious Thought in Analytic Philosophy of Language. New Haven: Yale University Press, 1997. Pp. 264. ISBN 0-300-06212-5
- Time, Change and Freedom. (co-authored with L. Nathan Oaklander). New York: Routledge, 1995, pp. 218. ISBN 0-415-10249-9
- The New Theory of Time. (co-authored and co-edited with L. Nathan Oaklander). New Haven: Yale University Press, 1994. Pp. 378. ISBN 0-300-05796-2
- Theism, Atheism and Big Bang Cosmology. (co-authored with William Lane Craig). Oxford: Oxford University Press, 1993. Pp. 357. ISBN 0-19-826383-X
- Language and Time. First Edition. New York. Oxford University Press. 1993. pp. 259. ISBN 0-19-515594-7
- The Felt Meanings of the World: A Metaphysics of Feeling. Purdue University Press :West Lafayette, 1986 (Paperback 2010). ISBN 0-911198-76-8

== See also ==
- American philosophy
- List of American philosophers
- List of nontheists (philosophy)
