= Barcan formula =

Schema in modal logic

In quantified modal logic, the Barcan formula and the converse Barcan formula (more accurately, schemata rather than formulas) (i) syntactically state principles of interchange between quantifiers and modalities; (ii) semantically state a relation between domains of possible worlds. The formulas were introduced as axioms by Ruth Barcan Marcus, in the first extensions of modal propositional logic to include quantification.

Related formulas include the Buridan formula.

== The Barcan formula ==
The Barcan formula is:

$$\forall x \Box Fx \rightarrow \Box \forall x Fx$$.

In English, the schema reads:

If every x is necessarily F, then it is necessary that every x is F.

It is equivalent to

$$\Diamond\exists xFx\to\exists x\Diamond Fx$$.

In English:

If it is possible that there exists an x that is F, then there exists an x that is possibly F.

The Barcan formula has generated some controversy because—in terms of possible world semantics—it implies that all objects which exist in any possible world (accessible to the actual world) exist in the actual world, i.e. that domains cannot grow when one moves to accessible worlds. This thesis is sometimes known as actualism—i.e. that there are no merely possible individuals. There is some debate as to the informal interpretation of the Barcan formula and its converse.

An informal argument against the plausibility of the Barcan formula would be the interpretation of the predicate Fx as "x is a machine that can tap all the energy locked in the waves of the Atlantic Ocean in a practical and efficient way". In its equivalent form above, the antecedent $\Diamond\exists xFx$ seems plausible since it is at least theoretically possible that such a machine could exist. However, it is not obvious that this implies that there is something that is possibly a machine which could tap the energy of the Atlantic.

== Converse Barcan formula ==
The converse Barcan formula is:

$$\Box \forall x Fx \rightarrow \forall x \Box Fx$$.

It is equivalent to

$$\exists x\Diamond Fx\to\Diamond\exists xFx$$.

If a frame is based on a symmetric accessibility relation, then the Barcan formula will be valid in the frame if, and only if, the converse Barcan formula is valid in the frame. It states that domains cannot shrink as one moves to accessible worlds, i.e. that individuals cannot cease to exist. The converse Barcan formula is taken to be more plausible than the Barcan formula.

== See also ==
- Commutative property
