= A posteriori necessity =

A posteriori necessity is a thesis in metaphysics and the philosophy of language, that some statements of which we must acquire knowledge a posteriori are also necessarily true. It challenges previously widespread belief that only a priori knowledge can be necessary. It draws on a number of philosophical concepts such as necessity, the causal theory of reference, rigidity, and the a priori–a posteriori distinction.

It was first introduced by philosopher Saul Kripke in his 1970 series of lectures at Princeton University. The transcript of these lectures were then compiled and assembled into his seminal book, Naming and Necessity.

== Main argument for a posteriori necessity ==
Here is an overview of the argument:

(P1) 'Hesperus' is a proper name that refers to the evening star. 'Phosphorus' is also a proper name and it refers to the morning star. But the evening star and the morning star are the same planetary body (Venus). So both names designate Venus.

(P2) If both names designate rigidly, they designate the same object (Venus) in every possible world in which it exists. Therefore (by the definition of 'necessary') 'Hesperus = Phosphorus' is necessarily true. If it is the case that in all possible worlds the identity claim "Hesperus is Phosphorus" is true, the statement is necessary.

(P3) The fact that Hesperus is Phosphorus was discovered by empirical observation, and it could not have been discovered a priori. Therefore, it is known a posteriori.

(C) Therefore, it is possible for knowledge obtained a posteriori to be necessary.

Other instances of a posteriori necessary truths include: "H_{2}O is water".

== Significance ==
Naming and Necessity is among the most important philosophical works of the 20th century. A posteriori necessity existing would make the distinction between a prioricity, analyticity, and necessity harder to discern because they were previously thought to be largely separated from the a posteriori, the synthetic, and the contingent.

Hilary Putnam comments on the significance of Kripke's counter-examples: "Since Kant there has been a big split between philosophers who thought that all necessary truths were analytic and philosophers who thought that some necessary truths were synthetic a priori. But none of these philosophers thought that a (metaphysically) necessary truth could fail to be a priori."

== See also ==
- Descriptivist theory of names
- Causal theory of reference
- Rigid designator
- Modality
