= Antiperistasis =

Philosophical term

Antiperistasis, in philosophy, is a general term for various processes, real or contrived, in which one quality heightens the force of another, opposing, quality.

== Overview ==
Historically, antiperistasis as a type of explanation was applied to numerous phenomena, from the interaction of quicklime with cold water, to the origin of thunder and lightning.

In his Timaeus, Plato introduces the concept of periosis pushing around in order to explain various phenomena. Plato, for instance, appeals to it to explain how respiration functions in human beings. His 'theory' has been most famously adopted by Aristotle who made popular the term antiperistasis. In a nutshell it was "the doctrine that a moving object, which is no longer in touch with the mover, is moved by the medium through which it moves. Logically, it is connected to the idea that void does not exist.

It was using this explanation that academic philosophers claimed that cold, on many occasions, increases a body's temperature, and dryness increases its moisture. Thus, it was said, quicklime (CaO) was apparently set ablaze when doused with cold water (an effect later explained as an exothermic reaction). It was also the understood reason for why water, such as that in wells, appeared warmer in winter than in summer (later explained as an example of sensory adaptation). It was also suggested that thunder and lightning were the results of antiperistasis caused by the coldness of the sky.

Peripatetic philosophers, who were followers of Aristotle, made extensive use of the principle of antiperistasis. According to such authors,

'Tis necessary that Cold and Heat be both of them endued with a self-invigorating Power, which each may exert when surrounded by its contrary; and thereby prevent their mutual Destruction. Thus it is supposed that in Summer, the Cold expelled from the Earth and Water by the Sun's scorching Beams, retires to the middle Region of the Air, and there defends itself against the Heat of the superior and inferior. And thus, also, in Summer, when the Air is about us in sultry hot, we find that Cellars and Vaults have the opposite Quality: so in Winter, when the external Air freezes the Lakes and Rivers, the internal Air, in the same Vaults and Cellars, becomes the Sanctuary of Heat; and Water, fresh drawn out of deeper Wells and Springs, in a cold Season, not only feels warm, but manifestly smokes.

— anon., 1728 Cyclopædia

Other examples used by the proponents of antiperistasis included the aphoristical saying of Hippocrates, "the viscera are hottest in the winter"; and the production of hail in the upper atmosphere, believed to occur only in the summer due to the increased heat of the sun.

Robert Boyle examined the doctrine in his work, "New Experiments and Observations upon Cold."

== See also ==
- Le Chatelier's principle
- Homeostasis
