= Saul Kripke =

American philosopher and logician (1940–2022)

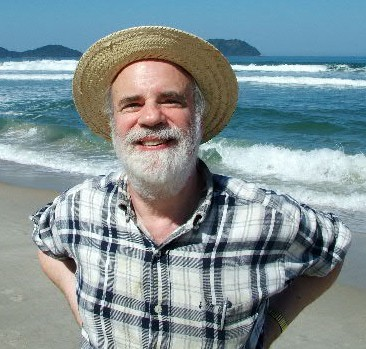
- Kripke in 2005
- Born: Saul Aaron Kripke; November 13, 1940; Bay Shore, New York, U.S.
- Died: September 15, 2022 (aged 81); Plainsboro, New Jersey, U.S.
- Relatives: Eric Kripke (cousin)
- Awards: Rolf Schock Prizes in Logic and Philosophy (2001)

Education
- Education: Harvard University (BS, 1962)

Philosophical work
- Era: Contemporary philosophy
- Region: Western philosophy
- School: Analytic; Scientific essentialism
- Institutions: Harvard University; Rockefeller University; Princeton University; CUNY Graduate Center
- Main interests: Logic (particularly modal); Philosophy of language Metaphysics; Set theory Epistemology; Philosophy of mind History of analytic philosophy
- Notable ideas: List: Kripke–Platek set theory Work on theory of reference (causal theory of reference, causal-historical theory of reference, direct reference theory, criticism of the Frege–Russell view) Admissible ordinal Kripke structure Rigid vs. flaccid designator A posteriori necessity The possibility of analytic a posteriori judgments Semantic theory of truth (Kripke's theory) Non-analytic, a posteriori necessary truths Contingent a priori Kripke semantics Disquotational principle Accessibility relation Rule-following paradox (Kripkenstein) Humphrey objection

Saul Aaron Kripke (/ˈkrɪpki/; November 13, 1940 – September 15, 2022) was an American philosopher and logician. He was a distinguished professor of philosophy at the Graduate Center of the City University of New York and a professor emeritus at Princeton University. From the 1960s until his death, he was a central figure in a number of fields related to mathematical and modal logic, philosophy of language and mathematics, metaphysics, epistemology, and recursion theory.

Kripke made influential and original contributions to logic, especially modal logic. His principal contribution is a semantics for modal logic involving possible worlds, now called Kripke semantics. He received the 2001 Schock Prize in Logic and Philosophy.

Kripke was also partly responsible for the revival of metaphysics and essentialism after the decline of logical positivism, claiming necessity is a metaphysical notion distinct from the epistemic notion of a priori, and that there are necessary truths that are known a posteriori, such as that water is H_{2}O. A 1970 Princeton lecture series, published in book form in 1980 as Naming and Necessity, is considered one of the most important philosophical works of the 20th century. It introduced the concept of names as rigid designators, designating (picking out, denoting, referring to) the same object in every possible world, as contrasted with descriptions. It also established Kripke's causal theory of reference, disputing the descriptivist theory found in Gottlob Frege's concept of sense and Bertrand Russell's theory of descriptions. Kripke is often seen in opposition to the other great late-20th-century philosopher to eschew logical positivism: W. V. O. Quine. Quine rejected essentialism and modal logic.

Kripke also gave an original reading of Ludwig Wittgenstein, known as "Kripkenstein", in his Wittgenstein on Rules and Private Language. The book contains his rule-following argument, a paradox for skepticism about meaning. Much of his work remains unpublished or exists only as tape recordings and privately circulated manuscripts.

== Biography ==
=== Early life and education ===
Saul Kripke was the oldest of three children born to Dorothy K. Kripke and Myer S. Kripke. Saul and his two sisters, Madeline and Netta, attended Dundee Grade School and Omaha Central High School. Kripke was labeled a prodigy, teaching himself Ancient Hebrew by the age of six, reading Shakespeare's complete works by nine, and mastering the works of Descartes and complex mathematical problems before finishing elementary school.

=== Academic career ===
Kripke wrote his first completeness theorem in modal logic at 17, and had it published a year later. After graduating from high school in 1958, he attended Harvard University, graduating summa cum laude in 1962 with a bachelor's degree in mathematics. During his sophomore year at Harvard, he taught a graduate-level logic course at nearby MIT. Upon graduation he received a Fulbright Fellowship, and in 1963 was appointed to the Society of Fellows. Kripke later said: "I wish I could have skipped college. I got to know some interesting people but I can't say I learned anything. I probably would have learned it all anyway just reading on my own." His cousin is Eric Kripke, a screenwriter and television producer.

After briefly teaching at Harvard, Kripke moved in 1968 to Rockefeller University in New York City, where he taught until 1976. In 1978 he took a chaired professorship at Princeton University. In 1988 he received the university's Behrman Award for distinguished achievement in the humanities. In 2002 Kripke began teaching at the CUNY Graduate Center, and in 2003 he was appointed a distinguished professor of philosophy there.

=== Death ===
Kripke died of pancreatic cancer on September 15, 2022, in Plainsboro, New Jersey, at the age of 81.

== Philosophy ==
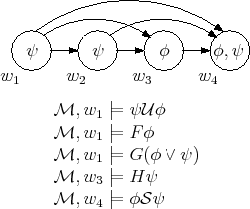
Example Kripke model for linear temporal logic, a particular modal logic

Kripke's contributions to philosophy include:

1. Kripke semantics for modal and related logics, published in several essays beginning in his teens.
2. His 1970 Princeton lectures Naming and Necessity (published in 1972 and 1980), which significantly restructured philosophy of language.
3. His interpretation of Wittgenstein.
4. His theory of truth.

He has also contributed to recursion theory (see admissible ordinal and Kripke–Platek set theory).

=== Modal logic ===
Two of Kripke's earlier works, "A Completeness Theorem in Modal Logic" (1959) and "Semantical Considerations on Modal Logic" (1963), the former written when he was a teenager, were on modal logic. The most familiar logics in the modal family are constructed from a weak logic called K, named after Kripke. Kripke introduced the now-standard Kripke semantics (also known as relational semantics or frame semantics) for modal logics. Kripke semantics is a formal semantics for non-classical logic systems. It was first made for modal logics, and later adapted to intuitionistic logic and other non-classical systems. The discovery of Kripke semantics was a breakthrough in the making of non-classical logics, because the model theory of such logics was absent before Kripke.

A Kripke frame or modal frame is a pair $\langle W,R\rangle$, where W is a non-empty set, and R is a binary relation on W. Elements of W are called nodes or worlds, and R is known as the accessibility relation. Depending on the properties of the accessibility relation (transitivity, reflexivity, etc.), the corresponding frame is described, by extension, as being transitive, reflexive, etc.

A Kripke model is a triple $\langle W,R,\Vdash\rangle$, where $\langle W,R\rangle$ is a Kripke frame, and $\Vdash$ is a relation between nodes of W and modal formulas, such that:

- $w\Vdash\neg A$ if and only if $w\nVdash A$,
- $w\Vdash A\to B$ if and only if $w\nVdash A$ or $w\Vdash B$,
- $w\Vdash\Box A$ if and only if $\forall u\,(w\; R\; u$ implies $u\Vdash A)$.

We read $w\Vdash A$ as "w satisfies A", "A is satisfied in w", or "w forces A". The relation $\Vdash$ is called the satisfaction relation, evaluation, or forcing relation. The satisfaction relation is uniquely determined by its value on propositional variables.

A formula A is valid in:

- a model $\langle W,R,\Vdash\rangle$, if $w\Vdash A$ for all w ∈ W,
- a frame $\langle W,R\rangle$, if it is valid in $\langle W,R,\Vdash\rangle$ for all possible choices of $\Vdash$,
- a class C of frames or models, if it is valid in every member of C.

We define Thm(C) to be the set of all formulas that are valid in C. Conversely, if X is a set of formulas, let Mod(X) be the class of all frames which validate every formula from X.

A modal logic (i.e., a set of formulas) L is sound with respect to a class of frames C, if L ⊆ Thm(C). L is complete with respect to C if L ⊇ Thm(C).

Semantics is useful for investigating a logic (i.e., a derivation system) only if the semantical entailment relation reflects its syntactical counterpart, the consequence relation (derivability). It is vital to know which modal logics are sound and complete with respect to a class of Kripke frames, and for them, to determine which class it is.

For any class C of Kripke frames, Thm(C) is a normal modal logic (in particular, theorems of the minimal normal modal logic, K, are valid in every Kripke model). But the converse does not hold generally. There are Kripke incomplete normal modal logics, which is unproblematic, because most of the modal systems studied are complete of classes of frames described by simple conditions.

A normal modal logic L corresponds to a class of frames C, if C = Mod(L). In other words, C is the largest class of frames such that L is sound wrt C. It follows that L is Kripke complete if and only if it is complete of its corresponding class.

Consider the schema T : $\Box A\to A$. T is valid in any reflexive frame $\langle W,R\rangle$: if $w\Vdash \Box A$, then $w\Vdash A$ since w R w. On the other hand, a frame which validates T has to be reflexive: fix w ∈ W, and define satisfaction of a propositional variable p as follows: $u\Vdash p$ if and only if w R u. Then $w\Vdash \Box p$, thus $w\Vdash p$ by T, which means w R w using the definition of $\Vdash$. T corresponds to the class of reflexive Kripke frames.

It is often much easier to characterize the corresponding class of L than to prove its completeness, thus correspondence serves as a guide to completeness proofs. Correspondence is also used to show incompleteness of modal logics: suppose L_{1} ⊆ L_{2} are normal modal logics that correspond to the same class of frames, but L_{1} does not prove all theorems of L_{2}. Then L_{1} is Kripke incomplete. For example, the schema $\Box(A\equiv\Box A)\to\Box A$ generates an incomplete logic, as it corresponds to the same class of frames as GL (viz. transitive and converse well-founded frames), but does not prove the GL-tautology $\Box A\to\Box\Box A$.

==== Canonical models ====
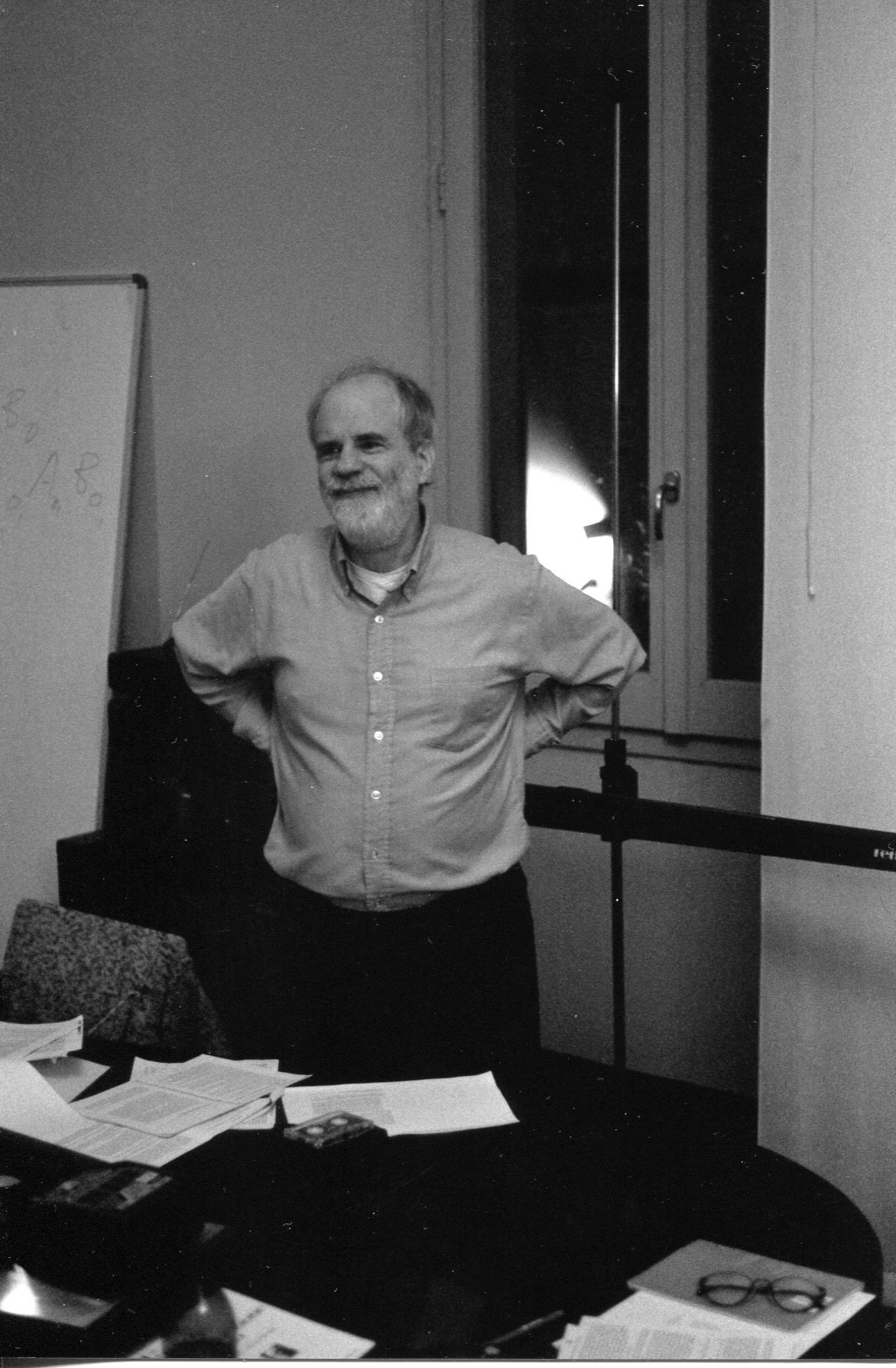
Kripke during a seminar at the University of Bologna in Italy, circa. 2005

For any normal modal logic L, a Kripke model (called the canonical model) can be constructed, which validates precisely the theorems of L, by an adaptation of the standard technique of using maximal consistent sets as models. Canonical Kripke models play a role similar to the Lindenbaum–Tarski algebra construction in algebraic semantics.

A set of formulas is L-consistent if no contradiction can be derived from them using the axioms of L, and modus ponens. A maximal L-consistent set (an L-MCS for short) is an L-consistent set which has no proper L-consistent superset.

The canonical model of L is a Kripke model $\langle W,R,\Vdash\rangle$, where W is the set of all L-MCS, and the relations R and $\Vdash$ are as follows:

$X\;R\;Y$ if and only if for every formula $A$, if $\Box A\in X$ then $A\in Y$,
$X\Vdash A$ if and only if $A\in X$.

The canonical model is a model of L, as every L-MCS contains all theorems of L. By Zorn's lemma, each L-consistent set is contained in an L-MCS, in particular every formula unprovable in L has a counterexample in the canonical model.

The main application of canonical models are completeness proofs. Properties of the canonical model of K immediately imply completeness of K with respect to the class of all Kripke frames. This argument does not work for arbitrary L, because there is no guarantee that the underlying frame of the canonical model satisfies the frame conditions of L.

We say that a formula or a set X of formulas is canonical with respect to a property P of Kripke frames, if

- X is valid in every frame which satisfies P,
- for any normal modal logic L which contains X, the underlying frame of the canonical model of L satisfies P.

A union of canonical sets of formulas is itself canonical. It follows from the preceding discussion that any logic axiomatized by a canonical set of formulas is Kripke complete, and compact.

The axioms T, 4, D, B, 5, H, G (and thus any combination of them) are canonical. GL and Grz are not canonical, because they are not compact. The axiom M by itself is not canonical (Goldblatt, 1991), but the combined logic S4.1 (in fact, even K4.1) is canonical.

In general, it is undecidable whether a given axiom is canonical. We know a nice sufficient condition: H. Sahlqvist identified a broad class of formulas (now called Sahlqvist formulas) such that:

- a Sahlqvist formula is canonical,
- the class of frames corresponding to a Sahlqvist formula is first-order definable,
- there is an algorithm which computes the corresponding frame condition to a given Sahlqvist formula.

This is a powerful criterion: for example, all axioms listed above as canonical are (equivalent to) Sahlqvist formulas. A logic has the finite model property (FMP) if it is complete with respect to a class of finite frames. An application of this notion is the decidability question: it follows from Post's theorem that a recursively axiomatized modal logic L which has FMP is decidable, provided it is decidable whether a given finite frame is a model of L. In particular, every finitely axiomatizable logic with FMP is decidable.

There are various methods for establishing FMP for a given logic. Refinements and extensions of the canonical model construction often work, using tools such as filtration or unravelling. As another possibility, completeness proofs based on cut-free sequent calculi usually produce finite models directly.

Most of the modal systems used in practice (including all listed above) have FMP.

In some cases, we can use FMP to prove Kripke completeness of a logic: every normal modal logic is complete wrt a class of modal algebras, and a finite modal algebra can be transformed into a Kripke frame. As an example, Robert Bull proved using this method that every normal extension of S4.3 has FMP, and is Kripke complete.

Kripke semantics has a straightforward generalization to logics with more than one modality. A Kripke frame for a language with $\{\Box_i\mid\,i\in I\}$ as the set of its necessity operators consists of a non-empty set W equipped with binary relations R_{i} for each i ∈ I. The definition of a satisfaction relation is modified as follows:

$w\Vdash\Box_i A$ if and only if $\forall u\,(w\;R_i\;u\Rightarrow u\Vdash A).$

==== Carlson models ====
A simplified semantics, discovered by Tim Carlson, is often used for polymodal provability logics. A Carlson model is a structure $\langle W,R,\{D_i\}_{i\in I},\Vdash\rangle$ with a single accessibility relation R, and subsets D_{i} ⊆ W for each modality. Satisfaction is defined as:

$w\Vdash\Box_i A$ if and only if $\forall u\in D_i\,(w\;R\;u\Rightarrow u\Vdash A).$

Carlson models are easier to visualize and to work with than usual polymodal Kripke models, but some Kripke complete polymodal logics are Carlson incomplete.

In Semantical Considerations on Modal Logic, published in 1963, Kripke responded to a difficulty with classical quantification theory. The motivation for the world-relative approach was to represent the possibility that objects in one world may fail to exist in another. But if standard quantifier rules are used, every term must refer to something that exists in all the possible worlds. This seems incompatible with our ordinary practice of using terms to refer to things that exist contingently.

Kripke's response to this difficulty was to eliminate terms. He gave an example of a system that uses the world-relative interpretation and preserves the classical rules. But the costs are severe. First, his language is artificially impoverished, and second, the rules for the propositional modal logic must be weakened.

=== Intuitionistic logic ===
Kripke semantics for intuitionistic logic follows the same principles as the semantics of modal logic, but uses a different definition of satisfaction.

An intuitionistic Kripke model is a triple $\langle W,\le,\Vdash\rangle$, where $\langle W,\le\rangle$ is a partially ordered Kripke frame, and $\Vdash$ satisfies the following conditions:

- if p is a propositional variable, $w\le u$, and $w\Vdash p$, then $u\Vdash p$ (persistency condition),
- $w\Vdash A\land B$ if and only if $w\Vdash A$ and $w\Vdash B$,
- $w\Vdash A\lor B$ if and only if $w\Vdash A$ or $w\Vdash B$,
- $w\Vdash A\to B$ if and only if for all $u\ge w$, $u\Vdash A$ implies $u\Vdash B$,
- not $w\Vdash\bot$.

Intuitionistic logic is sound and complete with respect to its Kripke semantics, and it has the Finite Model Property.

Intuitionistic first-order logic

Let L be a first-order language. A Kripke model of L is a triple $\langle W,\le,\{M_w\}_{w\in W}\rangle$, where $\langle W,\le\rangle$ is an intuitionistic Kripke frame, M_{w} is a (classical) L-structure for each node w ∈ W, and the following compatibility conditions hold whenever u ≤ v:

- the domain of M_{u} is included in the domain of M_{v},
- realizations of function symbols in M_{u} and M_{v} agree on elements of M_{u},
- for each n-ary predicate P and elements a_{1},...,a_{n} ∈ M_{u}: if P(a_{1},...,a_{n}) holds in M_{u}, then it holds in M_{v}.

Given an evaluation e of variables by elements of M_{w}, we define the satisfaction relation $w\Vdash A[e]$:

- $w\Vdash P(t_1,\dots,t_n)[e]$ if and only if $P(t_1[e],\dots,t_n[e])$ holds in M_{w},
- $w\Vdash(A\land B)[e]$ if and only if $w\Vdash A[e]$ and $w\Vdash B[e]$,
- $w\Vdash(A\lor B)[e]$ if and only if $w\Vdash A[e]$ or $w\Vdash B[e]$,
- $w\Vdash(A\to B)[e]$ if and only if for all $u\ge w$, $u\Vdash A[e]$ implies $u\Vdash B[e]$,
- not $w\Vdash\bot[e]$,
- $w\Vdash(\exists x\,A)[e]$ if and only if there exists an $a\in M_w$ such that $w\Vdash A[e(x\to a)]$,
- $w\Vdash(\forall x\,A)[e]$ if and only if for every $u\ge w$ and every $a\in M_u$, $u\Vdash A[e(x\to a)]$.

Here e(x→a) is the evaluation which gives x the value a, and otherwise agrees with e.

=== Naming and Necessity ===
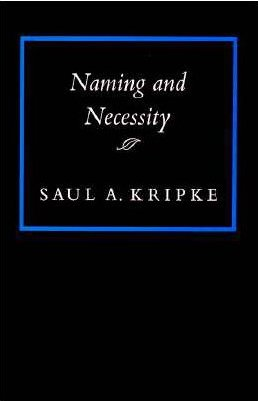
Cover of Naming and Necessity

The three lectures that form Naming and Necessity constitute an attack on the descriptivist theory of names. Kripke attributes variants of descriptivist theories to Frege, Russell, Wittgenstein, and John Searle, among others. According to descriptivist theories, proper names either are synonymous with descriptions, or have their reference determined by virtue of the name's being associated with a description or cluster of descriptions that an object uniquely satisfies. Kripke rejects both these kinds of descriptivism. He gives several examples purporting to render descriptivism implausible as a theory of how names get their references determined (e.g., surely Aristotle could have died at age two and so not satisfied any of the descriptions we associate with his name, but it would seem wrong to deny that he was still Aristotle).

As an alternative, Kripke outlined a causal theory of reference, according to which a name refers to an object by virtue of a causal connection with the object as mediated through communities of speakers. He points out that proper names, in contrast to most descriptions, are rigid designators: that is, a proper name refers to the named object in every possible world in which the object exists, while most descriptions designate different objects in different possible worlds. For example, "Richard Nixon" refers to the same person in every possible world in which Nixon exists, while "the person who won the United States presidential election of 1968" could refer to Nixon, Humphrey, or others in different possible worlds.

Kripke also raised the prospect of a posteriori necessities—facts that are necessarily true, though they can be known only through empirical investigation. Examples include "Hesperus is Phosphorus", "Cicero is Tully", "Water is H_{2}O", and other identity claims where two names refer to the same object. According to Kripke, the Kantian distinctions between analytic and synthetic, a priori and a posteriori, and contingent and necessary do not map onto one another. Rather, analytic/synthetic is a semantic distinction, a priori/a posteriori is an epistemic distinction, and contingent/necessary is a metaphysical distinction.

Finally, Kripke gave an argument against identity materialism in the philosophy of mind, the view that every mental particular is identical with some physical particular. Kripke argued that the only way to defend this identity is as an a posteriori necessary identity, but that such an identity—e.g., that pain is C-fibers firing—could not be necessary, given the (clearly conceivable) possibility that pain could be separate from the firing of C-fibers, or the firing of C-fibers be separate from pain. (Similar arguments have since been made by David Chalmers.) In any event, the psychophysical identity theorist, according to Kripke, incurs a dialectical obligation to explain the apparent logical possibility of these circumstances, since according to such theorists they should be impossible.

Kripke delivered the John Locke Lectures in philosophy at Oxford in 1973. Titled Reference and Existence, they were in many respects a continuation of Naming and Necessity, and deal with the subjects of fictional names and perceptual error. In 2013 Oxford University Press published the lectures as a book, also titled Reference and Existence.

In a 1995 paper, philosopher Quentin Smith argued that key concepts in Kripke's new theory of reference originated in the work of Ruth Barcan Marcus more than a decade earlier. Smith identified six significant ideas in the New Theory that he claimed Marcus had developed: (1) that proper names are direct references that do not consist of contained definitions; (2) that while one can single out a single thing by a description, this description is not equivalent to a proper name of this thing; (3) the modal argument that proper names are directly referential, and not disguised descriptions; (4) a formal modal logic proof of the necessity of identity; (5) the concept of a rigid designator, though Kripke coined that term; and (6) a posteriori identity. Smith argued that Kripke failed to understand Marcus's theory at the time but later adopted many of its key conceptual themes in his New Theory of Reference.

Other scholars have subsequently offered detailed responses arguing that no plagiarism occurred.

==== "A Puzzle about Belief" ====
In Naming and Necessity, Kripke argues for direct reference theory (that the meaning of a name is simply the object it refers to). Nevertheless, he acknowledges the possibility that propositions containing names may have some additional semantic properties, properties that could explain why two names referring to the same person may give different truth values in propositions about beliefs. For example, Lois Lane believes that Superman can fly, although she does not believe that Clark Kent can fly. According to the mediated reference theory of names, this is explained by the fact that the names "Superman" and "Clark Kent", though referring to the same person, have distinct semantic properties.

But in his article "A Puzzle about Belief" (1988) Kripke seems to oppose even this possibility. His argument can be reconstructed as follows: The idea that two names referring to the same object may have different semantic properties is supposed to explain the fact that the intersubstitution of coreferring names in propositions about beliefs can alter truth value (as in Lois Lane's case). But the same phenomenon occurs even without the intersubstitution of coreferring names: Kripke invites us to imagine a French, monolingual boy, Pierre, who believes the proposition expressed by "Londres est jolie" ("London is beautiful"). Pierre moves to London without realizing that London = Londres. He then learns English the same way a child would learn the language, that is, not by translating words from French to English. Pierre learns the name "London" from the unattractive part of the city where he lives, and so comes to believe that London is not beautiful. Pierre will now assent to the sentences "Londres est jolie" and "London is not beautiful". With only translation and disquotation, the puzzle can be generated: Pierre both believes that London is pretty and doesn't believe that London is pretty. This paradox arises without making use of intersubstitution of coreferring names. Kripke shows later in the article how this puzzle can be generated within a single language, using only disquotation. The upshot of this, according to Kripke, is that intersubstitution of coreferring names cannot be blamed for the difficulty created by belief contexts. If this is right, contra proponents of mediated reference theory, the inconsistency of belief contexts involving coreferring names cannot be taken as evidence against his direct reference theory of names.

=== Wittgenstein ===
First published in 1982, Kripke's Wittgenstein on Rules and Private Language contends that the central argument of Wittgenstein's Philosophical Investigations centers on a devastating rule-following paradox that undermines the possibility of our ever following rules in our use of language. Kripke writes that this paradox is "the most radical and original skeptical problem that philosophy has seen to date", and that Wittgenstein does not reject the argument that leads to the rule-following paradox, but accepts it and offers a "skeptical solution" to ameliorate the paradox's destructive effects.

Most commentators accept that Philosophical Investigations contains the rule-following paradox as Kripke presents it, but few have agreed with his attributing a skeptical solution to Wittgenstein. Kripke himself expresses doubts in Wittgenstein on Rules and Private Language as to whether Wittgenstein would endorse his interpretation of Philosophical Investigations. He says that the work should not be read as an attempt to give an accurate statement of Wittgenstein's views, but rather as an account of Wittgenstein's argument "as it struck Kripke, as it presented a problem for him".

The portmanteau "Kripkenstein" has been coined for Kripke's interpretation of Philosophical Investigations. Kripkenstein's main significance was a clear statement of a new kind of skepticism, dubbed "meaning skepticism": the idea that for isolated individuals there is no fact in virtue of which they mean one thing rather than another by the use of a word. Kripke's "skeptical solution" to meaning skepticism is to ground meaning in the behavior of a community.

Kripke's book generated a large secondary literature, divided between those who find his skeptical problem interesting and perceptive, and others, such as Gordon Baker, Peter Hacker, and Colin McGinn, who argue that his meaning skepticism is a pseudo-problem that stems from a confused, selective reading of Wittgenstein. Kripke's position has been defended against these and other attacks by the Cambridge philosopher Martin Kusch, and Wittgenstein scholar David G. Stern considers Kripke's book "the most influential and widely discussed" work on Wittgenstein since the 1980s.

=== Truth ===
In his 1975 article "Outline of a Theory of Truth", Kripke showed that a language can consistently contain its own truth predicate, something deemed impossible by Alfred Tarski, a pioneer in formal theories of truth. The approach involves letting truth be a partially defined property over the set of grammatically well-formed sentences in the language. Kripke showed how to do this recursively by starting from the set of expressions in a language that do not contain the truth predicate, and defining a truth predicate over just that segment: this action adds new sentences to the language, and truth is in turn defined for all of them. But unlike Tarski, Kripke lets "truth" be the union of all of these definition-stages; after a denumerable infinity of steps the language reaches a "fixed point" such that using Kripke's method to expand the truth-predicate does not change the language any further. Such a fixed point can then be taken as the basic form of a natural language containing its own truth predicate. But this predicate is undefined for any sentences that do not, so to speak, "bottom out" in simpler sentences not containing a truth predicate. That is, " 'Snow is white' is true" is well-defined, as is " ' "Snow is white" is true' is true," and so forth, but neither "This sentence is true" nor "This sentence is not true" receive truth-conditions; they are, in Kripke's terms, "ungrounded."

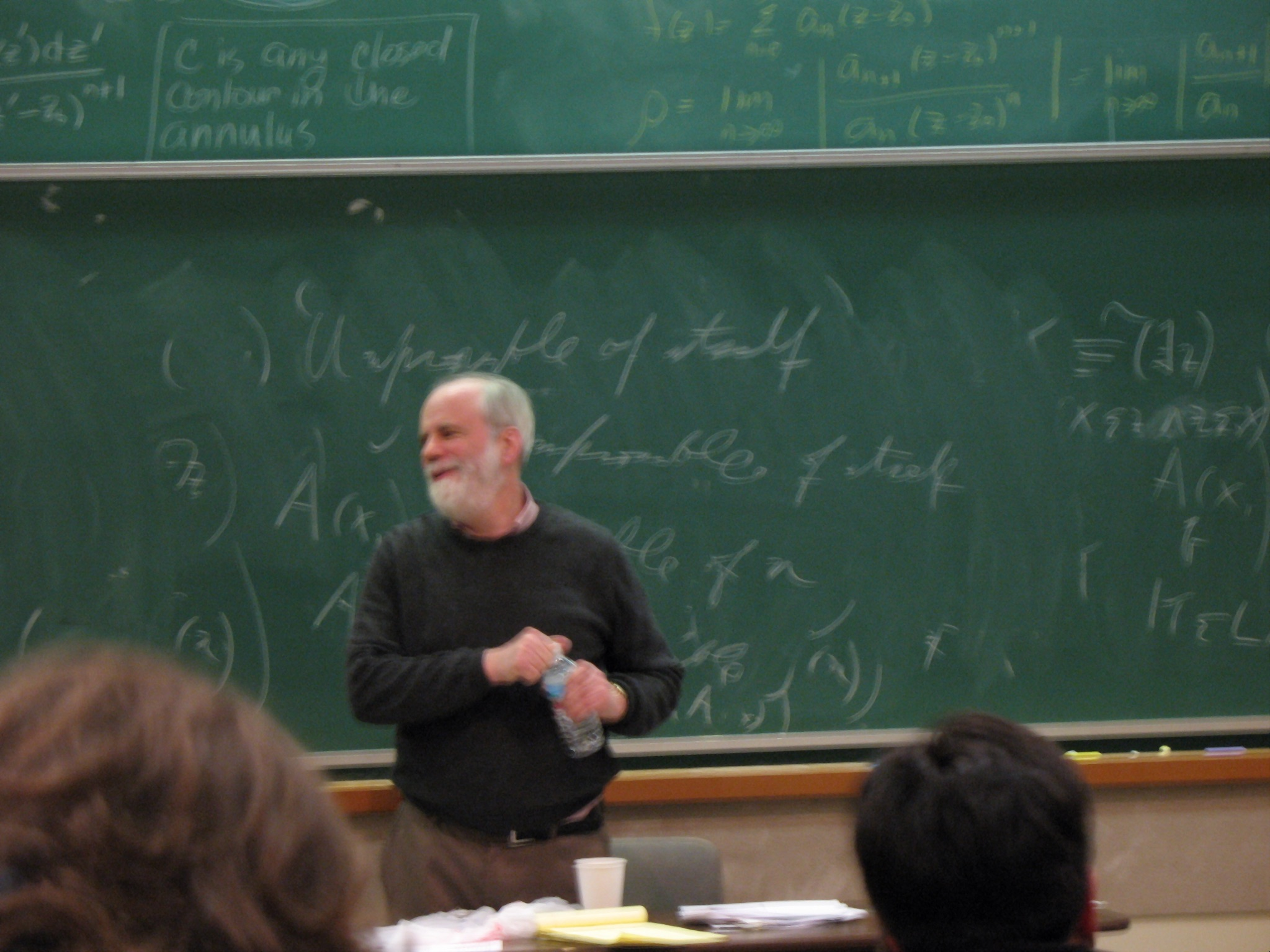
Saul Kripke gives a lecture about Gödel at the University of California, Santa Barbara.

Gödel's first incompleteness theorem demonstrates that self-reference cannot be avoided naively, since propositions about seemingly unrelated objects (such as integers) can have an informal self-referential meaning, and this idea – manifested by the diagonal lemma – is the basis for Tarski's theorem that truth cannot be consistently defined. But Kripke's truth predicate does not give a truth value (true/false) to propositions such as the one built in Tarski's proof, since it is provable by induction that it is undefined at stage $n$ for every finite $n$.

Kripke's proposal is problematic in the sense that while the language contains a "truth" predicate of itself (at least a partial one), some of its sentences – such as the liar sentence ("this sentence is false") – have an undefined truth value, but the language does not contain its own "undefined" predicate. In fact it cannot, as that would create a new version of the liar paradox, the strengthened liar paradox ("this sentence is false or undefined"). Thus while the liar sentence is undefined in the language, the language cannot express that it is undefined.

== Legacy ==
=== Saul Kripke Center ===
The mission of the Saul Kripke Center at the Graduate Center of the City University of New York is to preserve and to promote Kripke's work. Its director is Yale Weiss. The Saul Kripke Center holds events related to Kripke's work and is creating a digital archive of previously unpublished recordings of his lectures, lecture notes, and correspondence dating to the 1950s. In his review of Kripke's Philosophical Troubles, philosopher Mark Crimmins wrote, "That four of the most admired and discussed essays in 1970s philosophy are here is enough to make this first volume of Saul Kripke's collected articles a must-have... The reader's delight will grow as hints are dropped that there is a great deal more to come in this series being prepared by Kripke and an ace team of philosopher-editors at the Saul Kripke Center at The Graduate Center of the City University of New York."

== Personal life ==
Kripke married philosopher Margaret Gilbert in 1976. They divorced in 2000.

Kripke's father was the leader of Beth El Synagogue, the only Conservative congregation in Omaha; his mother wrote Jewish educational books for children. Kripke evaded publicly stating his personal views on the existence of God, but he was an observant Jew.

== Awards and honors ==
- Fulbright Scholar (1962–1963)
- Society of Fellows, Harvard University (1963–1966).
- Doctor of Humane Letters, honorary degree, University of Nebraska Omaha, 1977.
- Fellow, American Academy of Arts and Sciences (1978–).
- Corresponding Fellow, British Academy (1985–).
- Howard Behrman Award, Princeton University, 1988.
- Fellow, Academia Scientiarum et Artium Europaea (1993–).
- Doctor of Humane Letters, honorary degree, Johns Hopkins University, 1997.
- Doctor of Humane Letters, honorary degree, University of Haifa, Israel, 1998.
- Fellow, Norwegian Academy of Sciences (2000–).
- Schock Prize in Logic and Philosophy, Swedish Academy of Sciences, 2001.
- Doctor of Humane Letters, honorary degree, University of Pennsylvania, 2005.
- Fellow, American Philosophical Society (2005–).

=== Honorary degrees ===
Kripke received honorary degrees from the University of Nebraska Omaha (1977), Johns Hopkins University (1997), University of Haifa, Israel (1998), and the University of Pennsylvania (2005). He was a member of the American Philosophical Society and an elected Fellow of the American Academy of Arts and Sciences, and in 1985 was a Corresponding Fellow of the British Academy. He won the Schock Prize in Logic and Philosophy in 2001.

== Works ==
- Naming and Necessity. Cambridge, Mass.: Harvard University Press, 1972. ISBN 0-674-59845-8
- Wittgenstein on Rules and Private Language: an Elementary Exposition. Cambridge, Mass.: Harvard University Press, 1982. ISBN 0-674-95401-7.
- Philosophical Troubles. Collected Papers Vol. 1. New York: Oxford University Press, 2011. ISBN 9780199730155
- Reference and Existence – The John Locke Lectures. New York: Oxford University Press, 2013. ISBN 9780199928385

== See also ==
- American philosophy
- Barry Kripke (a character on The Big Bang Theory who is believed to be named after Saul)
