= Form of life =

Philosophical concept of Ludwig Wittgenstein

Form of life (German: Lebensform) is a term used sparingly by Ludwig Wittgenstein in his posthumously published works Philosophical Investigations (PI), On Certainty, and parts of his Nachlass. It is a term widely understood to refer to the shared background of human cultural practices, activities, and ways of living that provide the context within which language and meaning operate.

Wittgenstein in his Tractatus Logico-Philosophicus (TLP) was concerned with the structure of language, responding to Gottlob Frege and Bertrand Russell. Later, Wittgenstein found the need to revise the view he held in TLP, because he had not resolved issues concerning elementary propositions. Leading up to a revised view in his PI, Wittgenstein was still concerned with language, but he now focused on how language is used and did not insist that it has an inherent structure or set of rules. Late Wittgenstein saw language as emerging from human activity.

Italian philosopher Giorgio Agamben uses Wittgenstein's concepts in his analysis of the history of Western monasticism in order to rethink "bare life" in contemporary (bio)politics. In The Highest Poverty – Monastic Rules and Form-of-Life (2013 but originally published in Italian in 2011), he finds earlier versions of form-of-life in monastic rules, developing from 'vita vel regula', 'regula et vita', 'forma vivendi', and 'forma vitae'. Agamben looks at the emerging genre of written rules starting in the 9th century, and its development into both law and something beyond law in the Franciscan form-of-life, in which the Franciscans replaced the idea that we possess our life (or objects generally) with the concept of 'usus', that is 'use'.
