= Martin Kusch =

German philosopher

- Martin Kusch in 2024
- Born: 19 October 1959 (age 66)

Philosophical work
- Institutions: University of Vienna
- Main interests: Sociology of scientific knowledge

Martin Paul Heinrich Kusch (born 19 October 1959) is a professor of Philosophy at the University of Vienna. Until 2009, Kusch was a professor of Philosophy and Sociology of science at the Department of History and Philosophy of Science at Cambridge University. Prior to Cambridge, Kusch was a lecturer in the Science Studies Unit of the University of Edinburgh.

== Biography ==
Kusch's wide-ranging contributions to philosophy reflect both systematic and historical interests and cut across traditional disciplinary divides. He has published in the philosophy of the social sciences, epistemology, philosophy of language and mind, philosophy of the natural sciences, philosophy of technology, and the history of German and Austrian philosophy.

Kusch has also made important contributions to science and technology studies, particularly in the field of the sociology of scientific knowledge.

In addition, Kusch has written on the history of science with a special reference to the history of German psychology.

In 2005, he delivered the Leibniz Lectures at Leibniz University Hannover.

In 2025, he retired from the University of Vienna.

== Selected publications ==
=== Books ===
- Kusch, Martin (1984). Einzelheit und Allgemeinheit: Einführung in die Philosophie G.W.F. Hegels [Singularity and universality: introduction to philosophy G.W.F. Hegels] (in German). Jyväskylä, Finland: Jyväskylän yliopisto Filosofian laitos. ISBN 9789516791138. Reports from the Philosophy Department of the University of Jyväskylä.
- Kusch, Martin (1986). Ymmärtämisen haaste [The challenge of understanding: an introduction to hermeneutics] (in Finnish). Oulu: Pohjoinen. ISBN 9789517490429.
- Kusch, Martin; Hintikka, Jaakko (1988). Kieli ja Maailma [Language and the world] (in Finnish). Oulu: Pohjoinen. ISBN 9789517490849.
- Kusch, Martin (1989). Language as calculus vs. language as universal medium: a study in Husserl, Heidegger, and Gadamer. Dordrecht Boston: Kluwer Academic Publishers. ISBN 9780792303336.
- Kusch, Martin (1991). Foucault's strata and fields: an investigation into archaeological and genealogical science studies. Dordrecht Boston: Kluwer Academic Publishers. ISBN 9780792314622.
- Kusch, Martin (1995). Psychologism: a case study in the sociology of philosophical knowledge. London New York: Routledge. ISBN 9780203983898.
- Kusch, Martin; Collins, Harry M. (1998). The shape of actions what humans and machines can do. Cambridge, Mass: MIT Press. ISBN 9780262032575.
- Kusch, Martin (1999). Psychological knowledge: a social history and philosophy. London New York: Routledge. ISBN 9780415192538.
- Kusch, Martin, ed. (2000). The sociology of philosophical knowledge. Dordrecht Boston: Kluwer Academic Publishers. ISBN 9789048153909.
- Kusch, Martin (2002). Knowledge by agreement: the programme of communitarian epistemology. Oxford New York: Clarendon Press Oxford University Press. ISBN 9780199251223.
- Kusch, Martin (2006). A sceptical guide to meaning and rules: defending Kripke's Wittgenstein. Chesham England: Acumen. ISBN 9781844650651.
- Kusch, Martin, ed. (2019). The Emergence of Relativism: German Thought from the Enlightenment to National Socialism. London: Routledge. ISBN 9781138571877.
- Kusch, Martin (2020). Relativism in the Philosophy of Science. Cambridge: Cambridge University Press. ISBN 9781108969611.
- Kusch, Martin, ed. (2020). Social Epistemology and Relativism. London: Routledge. ISBN 9780367189389.
- Kusch, Martin, ed. (2020). The Routledge Handbook of Philosophy of Relativism. London: Routledge. ISBN 9781138484283.
- Kusch, Martin (2026). Wittgenstein and Relativism. Cambridge: Cambridge University Press. ISBN 9781009554527.
