= Scientific essentialism =

Ontological theory

Scientific essentialism, a view espoused by Saul Kripke and Hilary Putnam, maintains that there exist essential properties that objects possess (or instantiate) necessarily. In other words, having such and such essential properties is a necessary condition for membership in a given natural kind. For example, tigers are tigers in virtue of possessing a particular set of genetic properties, but identifying (or appearance-based) properties are nonessential properties. If a tiger lost a leg, or did not possess stripes, we would still call it a tiger. They are not necessary for being a member of the class of tigers.

It is important, however, that the set of essential properties of an object not be used to identify or be identified with that object because they are not necessary and sufficient, but only necessary. Having such and such a genetic code does not suffice for being a tiger. We would not call a piece of tiger tail a tiger, even though a piece of tiger tail contains the genetic information essential to being a tiger.

Other advocates of scientific essentialism include Brian Ellis, Caroline Lierse, John Bigelow, and Alexander Bird.
