= Naming and Necessity =

1980 philosophy book by Saul Kripke

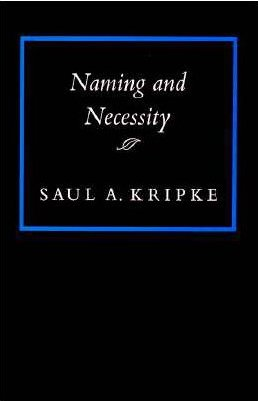
- Author: Saul A. Kripke
- Language: English
- Subjects: Metaphysics, Philosophy of language
- Publisher: Harvard University Press, Blackwell
- Publication date: 1980
- Publication place: United States
- Media type: Print (Hardback and Paperback)
- Pages: 184
- ISBN: 978-0-674-59845-4
- OCLC: 5726909
- Dewey Decimal: 160 19
- LC Class: BD417 .K74

Naming and Necessity is a 1980 book with the transcript of three lectures given by the philosopher Saul Kripke at Princeton University in 1970. In them, he deals with the debates over proper names in the philosophy of language and claims to refute Immanuel Kant's classical assumption that all necessary truth is known a priori.

The transcript was brought out originally in 1972 in Semantics of Natural Language, edited by Donald Davidson and Gilbert Harman. Among analytic philosophers, Naming and Necessity is widely considered one of the most important philosophical works of the 20th century. The title is a reference to Rudolf Carnap's book Meaning and Necessity, which, like Naming and Necessity, is about semantics and modal logic.

== Overview ==
Language is a primary concern of analytic philosophers, particularly the use of language to express concepts and to refer to individuals. In Naming and Necessity, Kripke considers several questions that are important within analytic philosophy:

- How do names refer to things in the world? (the problem of intensionality)
- Are all statements that can be known a priori necessarily true, and are all statements that are known a posteriori contingently true?
- Do objects (including people) have any essential properties?
- What is the nature of identity?
- How do natural kind terms refer and what do they mean?

Kripke's three lectures constitute an attack on descriptivist theories of proper names. Kripke attributes variants of descriptivist theories to Gottlob Frege, Bertrand Russell, Ludwig Wittgenstein, and John Searle, among others. According to descriptivist theories, proper names either are synonymous with descriptions or have their reference determined by virtue of the name's being associated with a description or cluster of descriptions that an object uniquely satisfies. Kripke rejects both these kinds of descriptivism. He gives several examples purporting to render descriptivism implausible as a theory of how names get their reference determined (e.g., surely Aristotle could have died at age two and so not satisfied any of the descriptions we associate with his name, and yet still have been Aristotle). As an alternative, Kripke outlines a causal theory of reference, according to which a name refers to an object by virtue of a causal connection with the object as mediated through communities of speakers. He points out that proper names, in contrast to most descriptions, are rigid designators: a proper name refers to the named object in every possible world in which the object exists, while most descriptions designate different objects in different possible worlds. For example, "Richard Nixon" refers to the same person in every possible world in which Nixon exists, while "the person who won the United States presidential election of 1968" could refer to Nixon, Hubert Humphrey, or others in different possible worlds.

Kripke also raises the prospect of a posteriori necessities—facts that are necessarily true, though they can be known only through empirical investigation. Examples include "Hesperus is Phosphorus", "Cicero is Tully", "Water is H2O" and other identity claims where two names refer to the same object.

Finally, Kripke gives an argument against identity materialism in the philosophy of mind, the view that every mental fact is identical with some physical fact. He argues that the only way to defend this identity is as an a posteriori necessary identity, but that such an identity—e.g., pain is C-fibers firing—could not be necessary, given the possibility of pain that has nothing to do with C-fibers firing. Similar arguments have been proposed by David Chalmers.

Kripke delivered the John Locke Lectures in philosophy at Oxford in 1973. Titled Reference and Existence, they are in many respects a continuation of Naming and Necessity, and deal with the subjects of fictional names and perceptual error. They have recently been published by Oxford University Press. Quentin Smith has claimed that some of the ideas in Naming and Necessity were first presented (at least in part) by Ruth Barcan Marcus. Kripke is alleged to have misunderstood Marcus's ideas during a 1969 lecture he attended (based on the questions he asked), and later arrived at similar conclusions. But Marcus has refused to publish a transcript of the lecture. Smith's view is controversial, and several well-known scholars (for example, Stephen Neale and Scott Soames) have offered detailed arguments that he is mistaken.

== A theory of naming ==
In the first lecture, Kripke introduces a schematic semi-formal version of the kind of "theory of naming" he is criticizing (1980:64–65). He begins the second lecture by recapitulating the "theses" of this theory, together with the "noncircularity condition" he discussed in closing the first lecture. Apparently, the theses and condition had been written up on a board for all to see. This text was reproduced, as quoted below, in the "lightly edited" transcript of 1980 (p. 71).

1. To every name or designating expression 'X', there corresponds a cluster of properties, namely the family of those properties φ such that A believes 'φX'.
2. One of the properties, or some conjointly, are believed by A to pick out some individual uniquely.
3. If most, or a weighted most, of the φ's are satisfied by one unique object y, then y is the referent of 'X'.
4. If the vote yields no unique object, 'X' does not refer.
5. The statement, 'If X exists, then X has most of the φ's' is known a priori by the speaker.
6. The statement, 'If X exists, then X has most of the φ's' expresses a necessary truth (in the idiolect of the speaker).

(C) For any successful theory, the account must not be circular. The properties which are used in the vote must not themselves involve the notion of reference in such a way that it is ultimately impossible to eliminate.

== Lecture I: January 20, 1970 ==
Kripke's main goals in this first lecture are to explain and critique the existing accounts of how names work.

In the mid-20th century, the most significant philosophical theory about the nature of names and naming was a theory of Gottlob Frege's that had been developed by Bertrand Russell, the descriptivist theory of names, sometimes called the "Frege–Russell description theory". Before Kripke gave his Naming and Necessity lectures, several criticisms of this theory had been published by leading philosophers, including Ludwig Wittgenstein, John Searle, and Peter Strawson. But Kripke believed that those arguments against the Frege–Russell theory failed to identify its true flaws.

== Lecture II: January 22, 1970 ==
In Lecture II, Kripke reconsiders the cluster theory of names and argues for his own position on the nature of reference, a position that contributed to the development of the causal theory of reference. One of his arguments against the cluster theory of names revolves around the fact that the theory's theses cannot be satisfied without some level of circular reasoning (for example, the name "Socrates" referring to the person usually named "Socrates", or the name "Einstein" commonly referring to "the man who discovered general relativity" while "general relativity" frequently refers to "the theory discovered by Einstein"). He criticizes John Searle (in Searle's "Proper Names") by remarking that it is not necessary that any one person or object (say, Aristotle) have the properties commonly attributed to said person or object (Aristotle might not have gone into pedagogy, for example). Another counterexample he gives to the cluster-of-descriptions theory of naming is in the form of a thought experiment in which Gödel's incompleteness theorems are found not to have been proved by Kurt Gödel but rather by a man named Schmidt; here, we still attribute the proving of the theorems to Gödel, whereas Schmidt is the one satisfying the description "the man who proved the incompleteness theorems". The cluster-of-descriptions theory teaches that if many of the statements $\phi$ are satisfied by a unique entity $y$, then $y$ is the referent of $X$ (where X is some type of designating expression).

== Lecture III: January 29, 1970 ==
In Lecture III, Kripke's main aim is to develop his account of the necessity of identity relations, and to discuss many of the implications of his account for issues like the identity of natural kinds, the distinction between epistemic and metaphysical necessity, the notion of metaphysical essences, and the mind–body problem.

Kripke begins by summarizing the conclusions of the first two lectures. Central to his previous lectures was his attack on the descriptivist theory of reference. Kripke offers two lines of criticism against Descriptivism. First, he points out that descriptions believed by speakers about a referent are not uniquely specifying, and thus are incapable of fixing reference. His second line of criticism is that even in cases where a speaker does believe something uniquely specifying, what is uniquely specified is not the referent.

Two other issues arise by way of recapitulation: first, Kripke concedes that in certain limited cases descriptions do in fact determine reference. But in these cases, they do no other semantic work. They do not allow us to characterize names as abbreviations or synonyms of the description. Second, Kripke argues that while some philosophers offer a revisionary account of identity, this account is inadequate, and we must instead retain the standard account of identity, which is not a relation between names, but a relation between an object and itself.

The referent of a name is usually determined by a series of causal links between people who have used the name. But when the referent of a name is determined by a property attributed to the thing named, the link is contingent, rather than necessary or essential. People begin using the name "Jack the Ripper" to refer to the person responsible for the murder of five women in London, so the name was fixed to its referent by a description. But the person who carried out the murders might have been jailed for another crime and thus never have had the property of murdering those women. So the link between the property of being a murderer and the person referred to is contingent. Finally, identity is not a relation that holds between names. It is a relation that holds between an object and itself. When someone accurately claims that two names refer to the same object, the claim is necessarily true, even though it may be known a posteriori. Thus Kripke claims to have refuted the assumption made by everyone before him that anything that is necessarily true will be known a priori (e.g., Immanuel Kant 1781/1787).

== Importance ==
In Philosophical Analysis in the Twentieth Century: Volume 2: The Age of Meaning, Scott Soames writes:

In the philosophy of language, Naming and Necessity is among the most important works ever, ranking with the classical work of Frege in the late nineteenth century, and of Russell, Tarski and Wittgenstein in the first half of the twentieth century . . . Naming and Necessity played a large role in the implicit, but widespread, rejection of the view—so popular among ordinary language philosophers—that philosophy is nothing more than the analysis of language.
