= Brain in a vat =

Philosophical thought experiment

A brain in a vat that believes it is walking

In philosophy, the brain in a vat (BIV) is a scenario used in a variety of thought experiments intended to draw out certain features of human conceptions of knowledge, reality, truth, mind, consciousness, and meaning. Gilbert Harman conceived the scenario, which Hilary Putnam turned into a modernized version of René Descartes's evil demon thought experiment. Following many science fiction stories, the scenario involves a mad scientist who removes a person's brain from its host body, suspends it in a vat of life-sustaining liquid, and connects its neurons by wires to a supercomputer that provides it with electrical impulses identical to those a brain normally receives. According to such stories, the computer would then be simulating reality (including appropriate responses to the brain's own output) and the "disembodied" brain would continue to have perfectly normal conscious experiences, like those of a person with an embodied brain, without these being related to objects or events in the real world. According to Putnam, the thought of "being a brain-in-a-vat" is either false or meaningless.

Considered a cornerstone of semantic externalism, the argument produced significant literature, and works such as The Matrix franchise are considered inspired by Putnam's argument.

== Intuitive version ==
Putnam's argument is based on the causal theory of reference, where a word describing a spatio-temporal object is meaningful if and only if it possesses an information-carrying causal relation to whatever it denotes. Next, an "envatted" brain is one whose entire world is composed of (say) electric manipulations performed by a computer simulation to which it is connected. With this much in place, consider the sentence "I am a brain in a vat" (BIV). If you are not a brain in a vat, the sentence is false by definition. If you are a brain in a vat, the terms "brain" and "vat" fail to denote actual brains and actual vats with whom you had an information-carrying causal interaction since, again by definition, the only interaction available is with the computer simulation, which is not information carrying. By the causal theory of reference, such references do not carry referential meaning. Thus, the sentence "I am a brain in a vat" is either false or meaningless.

== Uses ==
The simplest use of brain-in-a-vat scenarios is as an argument for philosophical skepticism and solipsism. A simple version of this runs as follows: since the brain in a vat gives and receives exactly the same impulses as it would if it were in a skull, and since these are its only way of interacting with its environment, then it is not possible to tell, from the perspective of that brain, whether it is in a skull or a vat. Yet in the first case, most of the person's beliefs may be true (if they believe, say, that they are walking down the street, or eating ice-cream); in the latter case, their beliefs are false. Since the argument says if one cannot know whether one is a brain in a vat, then one cannot know whether most of one's beliefs might be completely false. Since, in principle, it is impossible to rule out oneself being a brain in a vat, there cannot be good grounds for believing any of the things one believes; a skeptical argument would contend that one certainly cannot know them, raising issues with the definition of knowledge. Other philosophers have drawn upon sensation and its relationship to meaning in order to question whether brains in vats are really deceived at all, thus raising wider questions concerning perception, metaphysics, and the philosophy of language.

The brain-in-a-vat is a contemporary version of the argument given in Hindu Maya illusion, Zhuangzi's "Zhuangzi dreamed he was a butterfly", and the evil demon in René Descartes' Meditations on First Philosophy.

Recently, many contemporary philosophers believe that virtual reality will seriously affect human autonomy as a form of brain in a vat. But another view is that VR will not destroy our cognitive structure or take away our connection with reality. On the contrary, VR will allow us to have more new propositions, new insights and new perspectives to see the world.

== Philosophical debates ==
While the disembodied brain (the brain in a vat) can be seen as a helpful thought experiment, there are several philosophical debates surrounding the plausibility of the thought experiment. If these debates conclude that the thought experiment is implausible, a possible consequence would be that we are no closer to knowledge, truth, consciousness, representation, etc. than we were prior to the experiment.

=== Argument from biology ===
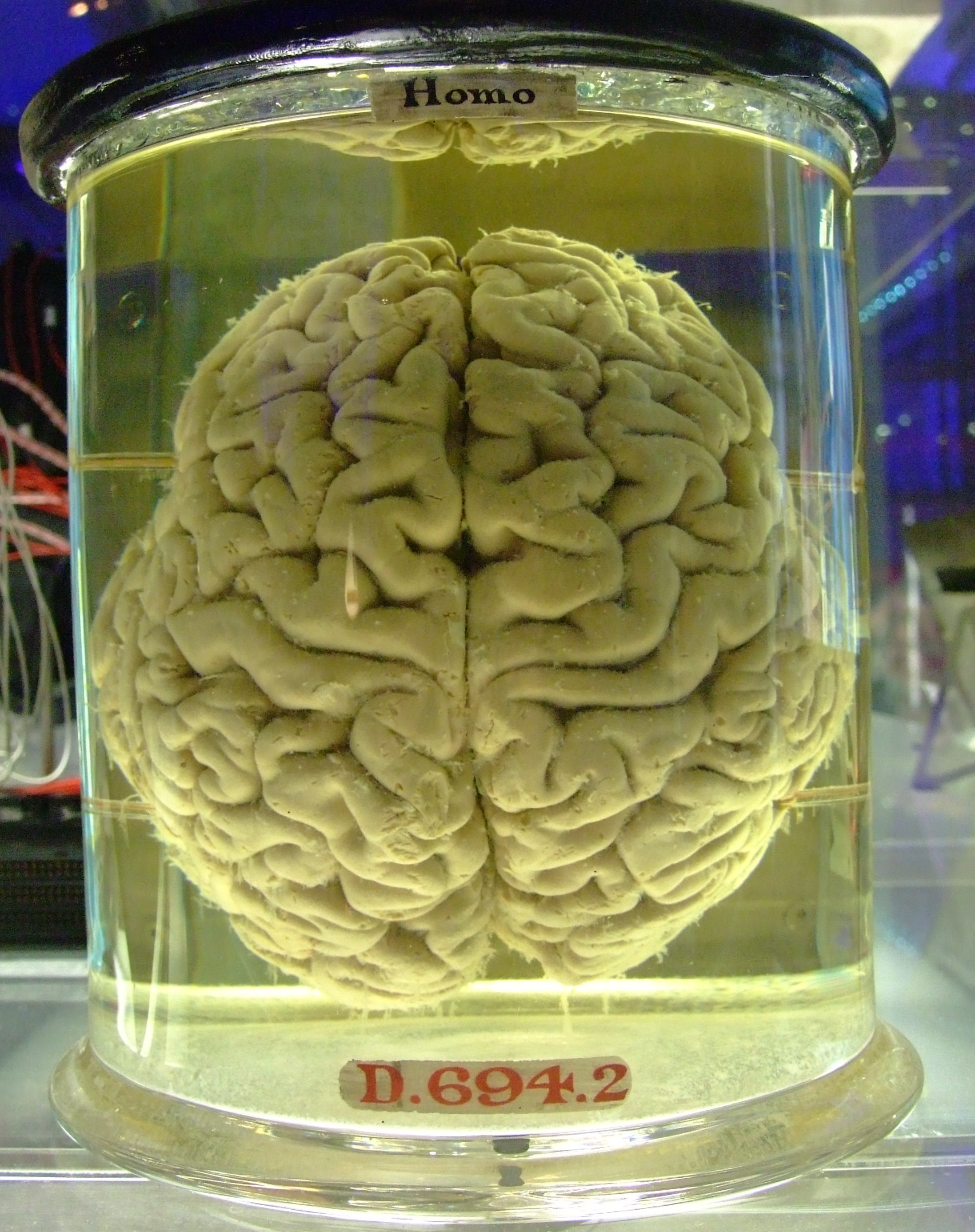
A human brain in jar

One argument against the BIV thought experiment derives from the idea that the BIV is not – and cannot be – biologically similar to that of an embodied brain (that is, a brain found in a person). Since the BIV is disembodied, it follows that it does not have similar biology to that of an embodied brain. That is, the BIV lacks the connections from the body to the brain, which renders the BIV neither neuroanatomically nor neurophysiologically similar to that of an embodied brain. If this is the case, we cannot say that it is even possible for the BIV to have similar experiences to the embodied brain, since the brains are not equal. However, it could be counter-argued that the hypothetical machine could be made to also replicate those types of inputs.

=== Argument from externalism ===
A second argument deals directly with the stimuli coming into the brain. This is often referred to as the account from externalism or ultra-externalism. In the BIV, the brain receives stimuli from a machine. In an embodied brain, however, the brain receives the stimuli from the sensors found in the body (via touching, tasting, smelling, etc.) which receive their input from the external environment. This argument oftentimes leads to the conclusion that there is a difference between what the BIV is representing and what the embodied brain is representing. This debate has been hashed out, but remains unresolved, by several philosophers including Uriah Kriegel, Colin McGinn, and Robert D. Rupert, and has ramifications for philosophy of mind discussions on (but not limited to) representation, consciousness, content, cognition, and embodied cognition.

=== Argument from incoherence ===
A third argument against BIV comes from a direction of incoherence, which was presented by the philosopher Hilary Putnam. He attempts to demonstrate this through the usage of a transcendental argument, in which he tries to illustrate that the thought experiment's incoherence lies on the basis that it is self-refuting. This relationship is further defined, through a theory of reference that suggested reference can not be assumed, and words are not automatically intrinsically connected with what it represents. This theory of reference would later become known as semantic externalism. This concept is further illustrated when Putnam establishes a scenario in which a monkey types out Hamlet by chance; however, this does not mean that the monkey is referring to the play, because the monkey has no knowledge of Hamlet and therefore can not refer back to it. He then offers the "Twin Earth" example to demonstrate that two identical individuals, one on the Earth and another on a "twin Earth", may possess the exact same mental state and thoughts, yet refer to two different things. For instance, when people think of cats, the referent of their thoughts would be the cats that are found on Earth. However, people's twins on twin Earth, though possessing the same thoughts, would instead be referring not to Earth's cats, but to twin Earth's cats. Bearing this in mind, he writes that a "pure" brain in a vat, i.e., one that has never existed outside of the simulation, could not even truthfully say that it was a brain in a vat. This is because the BIV, when it says "brain" and "vat", can only refer to objects within the simulation, not to things outside the simulation it does not have a relationship with. Putnam refers to this relationship as a "causal connection" which is sometimes referred to as "a causal constraint". Therefore, what it says is demonstrably false. Alternatively, if the speaker is not actually a BIV, then the statement is also false. He concludes, then, that the statement "I'm a BIV" is necessarily false and self-refuting. This argument has been explored at length in philosophical literature since its publication. A potential loophole in Putnam's reference theory is that a brain on Earth that is "kidnapped", placed into a vat, and subjected to a simulation could still refer to brains and vats which are real in the sense of Putnam, and thus correctly say it is a brain in a vat according to Putnamian reference theory. However, the notion that the "pure" BIV is incorrect and the reference theory underpinning it remains influential in the philosophy of mind, language and metaphysics. Anthony L. Brueckner has formulated an extension of Putnam's argument which rules out this loophole by employing a disquotational principle. It will be discussed in the following two sections.

=== Reconstructions of Putnam's argument ===
An issue that has arisen with Putnam's argument is that his premises only imply the metalinguistic statement "my utterances of 'I am a BIV' are false", but a skeptic may demand the object-language statement "I am a BIV" to be proven. To combat this issue, various philosophers have reconstructed Putnam's argument. Some, like Anthony L. Brueckner and Crispin Wright, have taken approaches that utilize disquotational principles. Others, like Ted A. Warfield, have taken approaches that focus on the concepts of self-knowledge and priori.

==== The disjunctive argument ====
One of the earliest but influential reconstructions of Putnam's transcendental argument was suggested by Anthony L. Brueckner. Brueckner's reconstruction is as follows: "(1) Either I am a BIV (speaking vat-English) or I am a non-BIV (speaking English). (2) If I am a BIV (speaking vat-English), then my utterances of 'I am a BIV' are true if I have sense impressions as of being a BIV. (3) If I am a BIV (speaking vat-English), then I do not have sense impressions as of being a BIV. (4) If I am a BIV (speaking vat-English), then my utterances of 'I am a BIV' are false. [(2), (3)] (5) If I am a non-BIV (speaking English), then my utterances of 'I am a BIV' are true if I am a BIV. (6) If I am a non-BIV (speaking English), then my utterances of 'I am a BIV' are false. [(5)] (7) My utterances of 'I am a BIV' are false. [(1), (4), (6)]" Though these premises further define Putnam's argument, they do not so far prove "I am not a BIV", because, although the premises imply the metalinguistic statement "my utterances 'I am a BIV' are false", they do not yet imply the object-language statement "I am not a BIV". To achieve the Putnamian conclusion, Brueckner strengthens his argument by employing the disquotational principle "My utterances of 'I am not a BIV' are true if I am not a BIV." This statement is justified since the metalanguage that contains the tokens for the disquotational principle also contains the object language tokens to which the utterances 'I am not a BIV' belong.

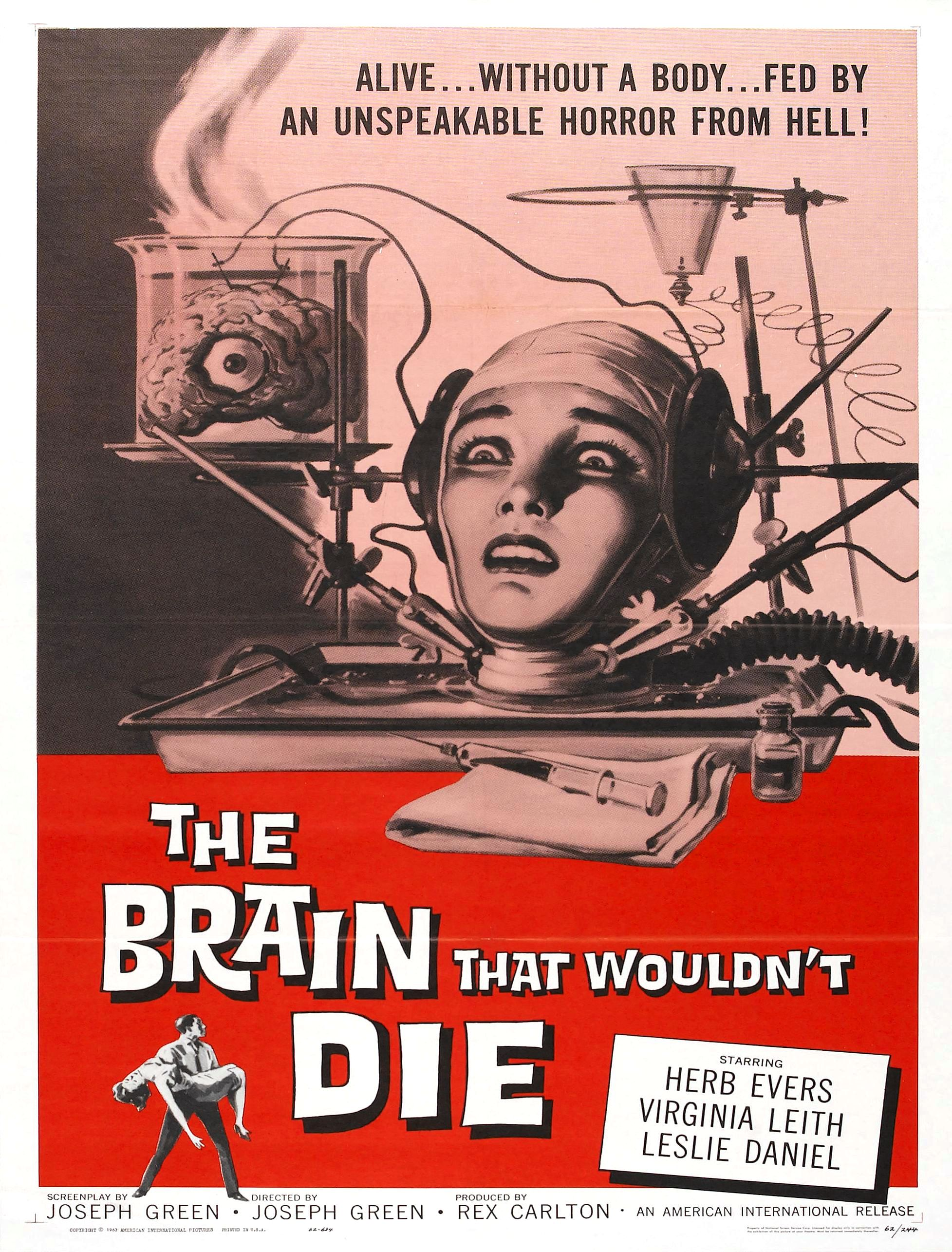
A poster for the film The Brain That Wouldn't Die, 1962

== In fiction ==
- Agents of S.H.I.E.L.D., Season 4
- Alita: Battle Angel
- Avatar
- Bliss
- "The Brain of Colonel Barham", a 1965 episode of the TV series The Outer Limits
- The Brain of Morbius
- Brain (novel)
- Brainstorm
- Caprica
- Chappie
- The City of Lost Children
- Cold Lazarus
- The Colossus of New York
- Dark Star
- Donovan's Brain
- Existenz
- Fallout series
  - Point Lookout, an expansion pack for Fallout 3
  - Old World Blues, an expansion pack for Fallout: New Vegas
  - Automatron, an expansion pack for Fallout 4
- "Flashes Before Your Eyes", an episode of Lost
- Futurama
- Gangers in Doctor Who
- Ghost in the Shell
- Inception
- "The Inner Light", an episode of Star Trek: The Next Generation
- Kavanozdaki Adam
- Lies of P, in the Overture DLC
- Lobotomy Corporation
- The Man with Two Brains
- The Matrix film series
- "Out of Time", an episode of Red Dwarf
- Possible Worlds
- Psycho-Pass
- Repo Men
- RoboCop
- Saints Row IV
- "Ship in a Bottle", an episode of Star Trek: The Next Generation
- Sid Meier's Alpha Centauri
- Soma
- Source Code
- "Spock's Brain", an episode of Star Trek: The Original Series
- The Star Diaries
- Steins;Gate 0
- Strange Days
- The Thirteenth Floor
- Total Recall
- Transcendence
- Tron
- Tron: Legacy
- Upload (TV series)
- "The Vacation Goo", an episode of American Dad!
- Where am I?, written by Daniel Dennett
- The Whisperer in Darkness
- "White Christmas - Part II", an episode of Black Mirror
- "William and Mary" by Roald Dahl
  - Adapted into the first episode of Way Out in 1961
  - Adapted again for Tales of the Unexpected in 1979
- World on a Wire

== See also ==
- Boltzmann brain
- Borg (Star Trek)
- Dream argument
- Evil demon
- Experience machine
- Floating man (Avicenna thought experiment)
- Human Brain Project
- Internalism and externalism
- Isolated brain
- Metaverse
- Mind uploading
- Neurally controlled animat
- Organoid intelligence
- Red pill
- Simulation hypothesis
- Skeptical hypothesis
- Solipsism
- Technological singularity
- Transhumanism
- Wirehead (science fiction)
