= Hilary Kornblith =

American philosopher

Hilary Kornblith is an American philosopher. He is a professor of philosophy at the University of Massachusetts Amherst and one of contemporary epistemology's most prominent proponents of naturalized epistemology.

== Biography ==
Kornblith received his B.A. from State University of New York at Buffalo in 1975 and his PhD from Cornell University in 1980, where he studied under Sydney Shoemaker and Richard Boyd. Before coming to University of Massachusetts in 2003, Kornblith taught at the University of Vermont, where he also chaired the department from 1991 to 1997. His research interests include epistemology, metaphysics and the philosophy of mind. Apart from naturalized epistemology, his most recent work includes the role of intuitions in philosophical theorizing, the conflicts between internalism and externalism in epistemology, and the mental states of non-human animals.

== Naturalistic account of inductive inference ==
In his 1993 book Inductive Inference and Its Natural Ground (MIT Press, 1993) Kornblith argues that inductive knowledge is possible by virtue of a fit between our innate psychological capacities and the causal structure of the world. Following Boyd, Kornblith takes the causal structure in question to be a structure of natural kinds, i.e., of homeostatically clustered properties. Such natural kinds provide a natural ground for inductive inference by virtue of the fact that our innate inferential tendencies (as revealed by empirical psychology) are structured in a way that assumes a world of natural kinds, and, thereby, tend to provide us with accurate beliefs about the world in an environment populated by such natural kinds.

== Knowledge as a natural kind ==
Kornblith is perhaps most well known for his defense of the view that knowledge is a natural kind. This claim is defended in his book Knowledge and its Place in Nature (Oxford University Press, 2002) where Kornblith argues that knowledge, as it is being studied in cognitive ethology, is a sufficiently robust and inductively valuable category to qualify as a natural kind. Consequently, he claims, the proper method for epistemology is empirical, contrary to what has been assumed by most epistemologists, who traditionally have proceeded by way of conceptual analysis and the probing of intuitions rather than by way of empirical investigation.

== Against conceptual analysis ==
Kornblith's case for knowledge as a natural kind provides the basis for his critique of philosophy as conceptual analysis. According to Kornblith, the proper object of philosophical analysis is not concepts, but the phenomena picked out by those concepts. At the same time, Kornblith's work in semantics indicates that his claims about conceptual analysis can, in fact, be motivated independently of his view on knowledge as a natural kind. In particular, he has argued that semantic externalism provides the correct semantics not only for natural kinds but also for artifactual kinds — a claim that, if true, would lend plausibility to the idea that empirical investigation provides a promising philosophical method, quite independently of whether or not a majority of the objects of philosophical inquiry turn out to be natural kinds.

== Bibliography ==
=== Books ===
- Inductive Inference and its Natural Ground, MIT Press, 1993.
- Naturalizing Epistemology, (Ed.), MIT Press, 1985. 2nd Edition, 1994.
- Epistemology: Internalism and Externalism, (Ed.), Blackwell Publishers Inc., 2001.
- Knowledge and its Place in Nature, Oxford University Press, 2002.
- On Reflection, Oxford University Press, 2012.
- A Naturalistic Epistemology: Selected Papers, Oxford University Press, 2014.
- Second Thoughts and the Epistemological Enterprise, Cambridge University Press, 2019.
- Scientific Epistemology, Oxford University Press, 2022.

=== Articles ===
- "Belief in the Face of Controversy," in T. Warfield and R. Feldman, eds., Disagreement, Oxford University Press, forthcoming.
- "What Reflective Endorsement Cannot Do," Philosophy and Phenomenological Research, 2010, 80 (1), 1-19.
- "A Reliabilist Solution to the Problem of Promiscuous Bootstrapping," Analysis, 2009, 69 (2).
- "The Naturalistic Project in Epistemology: Where Do We Go from Here?," in C. Mi and R. Chen, (Eds.), Naturalized Epistemology and Philosophy of Science, Rodopi (Amsterdam), 2007, 39-59.
- "Naturalism and Intuitions," Grazer Philosophische Studien, 2007, 72, 27-49.
- "How to Refer to Artifacts," in E. Margolis and S. Laurence, (Eds.), Creations of the Mind: Essays on Artifacts and their Representation, Oxford University Press, 2007, 138-149.
- "The Metaphysical Status of Knowledge," Philosophical Issues, 2007, 17 (1), 145–164.
- "Appeals to Intuition and the Ambitions of Epistemology," in S. Hetherington, (Ed.), Epistemology Futures, Oxford University Press, 2006, 10-25.
- "The Role of Intuition in Philosophical Inquiry," in M. DePaul and W. Ramsey, (Eds.), Rethinking Intuition, Rowman and Littlefield, 1998, 129-141.
- "Referring to Artifacts," Philosophical Review, LXXXIX, 1980, 109-114.

== See also ==
- American philosophy
- List of American philosophers
