= Anti-individualism =

Anti-individualism (also known as content externalism) is an approach to linguistic meaning in philosophy, the philosophy of psychology, and linguistics.

The proponents arguing for anti-individualism in these areas have in common the view that what seems to be internal to the individual is to some degree dependent on the social environment, thus self-knowledge, intentions, reasoning and moral value may variously be seen as being determined by factors outside the person. The position has been supported by Sanford Goldberg and by other thinkers such as Hilary Putnam and Tyler Burge.

== Overview ==
Academic discussion negotiating anti-individualism as a reasonable stance started with Tyler Burge's 1988 Individualism and Self-Knowledge being particularly influential. In it, Burge set out to argue for a limited agreement with the Cartesian model of self-cognition as being Authoritative, but also pointed out that knowledge of self-cognition was not always absolute, allowing for the individuation of thought to originate from both the external content of our environment as well as from the internal landscape of our self-knowledge as it is still being discovered: "One can know what one's mental events are and yet not know relevant general facts about the conditions for individuating those events. It is simply not true that the cogito gives us knowledge of the individuation conditions of our thoughts which enables us to "shut off" their individuation conditions from the physical environment".

Michael McKinsey builds on this in 1991 discussing Burge's view in his paper Anti-Individualism and Privileged Access arguing that there is no warrant to an epistemic narrow state of mind (i.e., privileged access) and that there is only a wide state of mind as influenced by the conditions of individuation of thought. Anthony Brueckner then questions McKinsey's take on Burge and McKinsey replies in his Accepting the Consequences of Anti-individualism.

Many of the essays found in Hilary Putnam's The Twin Earth Chronicles are considered early formative works for the anti-individualist model of meaning.

== See also ==
- Externalism
