= Boundaries of the Mind =

2004 book by Robert A. Wilson

Boundaries of the Mind: The Individual in the Fragile Sciences
- Author: Robert A. Wilson
- Language: English
- Genre: Philosophy
- Publisher: Cambridge University Press
- Publication date: 2004
- Publication place: United States
- Media type: Print (all)
- Pages: 392 pp
- ISBN: 978-0-521-54494-8
- OCLC: 53144585
- Dewey Decimal: 128/.2 22
- LC Class: BD418.3 .W535 2004

Boundaries of the Mind (2004) is a thorough treatment of the role and conceptualization of the individual in psychology, by author Robert A. Wilson, a professor in the Department of Philosophy at the University of Alberta.

== Structure ==
It is the first book in a planned three-volume set, entitled The Individual in the Fragile Sciences. The second volume examines the individual in biological sciences and the third, the individual's role in social sciences.

The book is divided into four parts:

- Part I motivates the study of the individual in psychology, provides a framework for contrasting nativist and empiricist views and provides a history of psychology that traces its gradual independence from physiology and philosophy to a subject in its own right.
- Part II spans topics for which Wilson is already well-known: the individualism–externalism debate, narrow and wide content, and the metaphysics of realization.
- Part III explores the consequences of this radical form of externalism from the perspective of various research programs in psychology: memory, development, and theory of mind. Wilson applies his externalist framework to stake out his own conception of consciousness, the TESEE acronym: Temporally Extended, Scaffolded, Embodied, Embedded.
- Part IV closes the book with a discussion of the cognitive metaphor in the biological and social sciences.

== Approach ==
TESEE is an approach to the processes of awareness/introspection, meta-representation and attention. It is continuous with the embedded and embodied approach to memory, cognitive development, and theory of mind.

Its complicated processes of awareness extend beyond the immediate subject in space and time. They exploit information-rich external bits of language and navigation equipment (the scaffolds) and rely on dynamic relations between the subject's body and the environment in which it is located.

This approach can be extended to phenomenal consciousness, arguing that a phenomenal property is not an intrinsic property of experience but rather a feature of the representation of its objects. As such, phenomenal properties inherit their importance from the intentional contents to which they apply. According to representationalists such as Fred Dretske, William Lycan, and Michael Tye - phenomenal consciousness is externalistic. Thus Wilson thinks that this global externalism goes both too far and not far enough.

TESEE conceptions of vision and visual consciousness relies on the sensorimotor theory of visual consciousness of philosophers Alva Noë and Susan Hurley, and psychologist J. Kevin O'Regan, arguing that vision, like touch, involves active and dynamic exploration of the contingent features of the environment.

== Second book ==
The second book is Genes and the Agents of Life: The Individual in the Fragile Sciences (Biology) published in 2005.
