= Exobrain =

Exobrain may refer to:

- Externalism, the philosophy of the mind's existence outside of the brain and body
- Exocortex, an artificial external information processing system that would augment a brain's biological high-level cognitive processes
