= Robert Andrew Wilson =

Robert Andrew Wilson may refer to

- Robert Wilson (Canadian rower) (born 1935)
- Robert Wilson (philosopher) (born 1964)
