= Internalism and externalism =

Philosophical terms

Internalism and externalism are two opposite ways of integrating and explaining various subjects in several areas of philosophy. These include human motivation, knowledge, justification, meaning, and truth. The distinction arises in many areas of debate with similar but distinct meanings. Internal–external distinction is a distinction used in philosophy to divide an ontology into two parts: an internal part concerning observation related to philosophy, and an external part concerning question related to philosophy.

Internalism is the thesis that no fact about the world can provide reasons for action independently of desires and beliefs. Externalism is the thesis that reasons are to be identified with objective features of the world.

== Moral philosophy ==
=== Motivation ===
In contemporary moral philosophy, motivational internalism (or moral internalism) is the view that moral convictions (which are not necessarily beliefs, e.g. feelings of moral approval or disapproval) are intrinsically motivating. That is, the motivational internalist believes that there is an internal, necessary connection between one's conviction that X ought to be done and one's motivation to do X. Conversely, the motivational externalist (or moral externalist) claims that there is no necessary internal connection between moral convictions and moral motives. That is, there is no necessary connection between the conviction that X is wrong and the motivational drive not to do X. (The use of these terms has roots in W.D. Falk's (1947) paper "'Ought' and Motivation".)

These views in moral psychology have various implications. In particular, if motivational internalism is true, then amorality is unintelligible (and metaphysically impossible). An amoralist is not simply someone who is immoral, rather it is someone who knows what the moral things to do are, yet is not motivated to do them. Such an agent is unintelligible to the motivational internalist, because moral judgments about the right thing to do have built into them corresponding motivations to do those things that are judged by the agent to be the moral things to do. On the other hand, an amoralist is entirely intelligible to the motivational externalist, because the motivational externalist thinks that moral judgments about what is right do not necessitate some motivation to do those things that are judged to be the right thing to do; rather, an independent desire—such as the desire to do the right thing—is required (Brink, 2003), (Rosati, 2006).

=== Reasons ===
There is also a distinction in ethics and action theory, largely made popular by Bernard Williams (1979, reprinted in 1981), concerning internal and external reasons for an action. An internal reason is, roughly, something that one has in light of one's own "subjective motivational set"—one's own commitments, desires (or wants), goals, etc. On the other hand, an external reason is something that one has independent of one's subjective motivational set. For example, suppose that Sally is going to drink a glass of poison, because she wants to commit suicide and believes that she can do so by drinking the poison. Sally has an internal reason to drink the poison, because she wants to commit suicide. However, one might say that she has an external reason not to drink the poison because, even though she wants to die, one ought not to kill oneself no matter what—regardless of whether one wants to die.

Some philosophers embrace the existence of both kinds of reason, while others deny the existence of one or the other. For example, Bernard Williams (1981) argues that there are really only internal reasons for action. Such a view is called internalism about reasons (or reasons internalism). Externalism about reasons (or reasons externalism) is the denial of reasons internalism. It is the view that there are external reasons for action; that is, there are reasons for action that one can have even if the action is not part of one's subjective motivational set.

Consider the following situation. Suppose that it's against the moral law to steal from the poor, and Sasha knows this. However, Sasha doesn't desire to follow the moral law, and there is currently a poor person next to him. Is it intelligible to say that Sasha has a reason to follow the moral law right now (to not steal from the poor person next to him), even though he doesn't care to do so? The reasons externalist answers in the affirmative ("Yes, Sasha has a reason not to steal from that poor person."), since he believes that one can have reasons for action even if one does not have the relevant desire. Conversely, the reasons internalist answers the question in the negative ("No, Sasha does not have a reason not to steal from that poor person, though others might."). The reasons internalist claims that external reasons are unintelligible; one has a reason for action only if one has the relevant desire (that is, only internal reasons can be reasons for action). The reasons internalist claims the following: the moral facts are a reason for Sasha's action not to steal from the poor person next to him only if he currently wants to follow the moral law (or if not stealing from the poor person is a way to satisfy his other current goals—that is, part of what Williams calls his "subjective motivational set"). In short, the reasoning behind reasons internalism, according to Williams, is that reasons for action must be able to explain one's action; and only internal reasons can do this.

== Epistemology ==
=== Justification ===
==== Internalism ====
Two main varieties of epistemic internalism about justification are access internalism and ontological internalism. Access internalists require that a believer must have internal access to the justifier(s) of their belief p in order to be justified in believing p. For the access internalist, justification amounts to something like the believer being aware (or capable of being aware) of certain facts that make her belief in p rational, or them being able to give reasons for her belief in p. At minimum, access internalism requires that the believer have some kind of reflective access or awareness to whatever justifies her belief. Ontological internalism is the view that justification for a belief is established by one's mental states. Ontological internalism can be distinct from access internalism, but the two are often thought to go together since we are generally considered to be capable of having reflective access to mental states.

One popular argument for internalism is known as the 'new evil demon problem'. The new evil demon problem indirectly supports internalism by challenging externalist views of justification, particularly reliabilism. The argument asks us to imagine a subject with beliefs and experiences identical to ours, but the subject is being systematically deceived by a malicious Cartesian demon so that all their beliefs turn out false. In spite of the subject's unfortunate deception, the argument goes, we do not think this subject ceases to be rational in taking things to be as they appear as we do. After all, it is possible that we could be radically deceived in the same way, yet we are still justified in holding most of our beliefs in spite of this possibility. Since reliabilism maintains that one's beliefs are justified via reliable belief-forming processes (where reliable means yielding true beliefs), the subject in the evil demon scenario would not likely have any justified beliefs according to reliabilism because all of their beliefs would be false. Since this result is supposed to clash with our intuitions that the subject is justified in their beliefs in spite of being systematically deceived, some take the new evil demon problem as a reason for rejecting externalist views of justification.

==== Externalism ====
Varieties of epistemic externalism about justification emerged during the late 20th century. Externalist conceptions of justification assert that facts external to the believer can serve as the justification for a belief. According to the externalist, a believer need not have any internal access or cognitive grasp of any reasons or facts which make their belief justified. The externalist's assessment of justification can be contrasted with access internalism, which demands that the believer have internal reflective access to reasons or facts which corroborate their belief in order to be justified in holding it. Externalism, on the other hand, maintains that the justification for someone's belief can come from facts that are entirely external to the agent's subjective awareness.

Alvin Goldman, one of the most well-known proponents of externalism in epistemology, is known for developing a popular form of externalism called reliabilism. In his paper, “What is Justified Belief?” Goldman characterizes the reliabilist conception of justification as such:

"If S’s believing p at t results from a reliable cognitive belief-forming process (or set of processes), then S’s belief in p at t is justified.”

Goldman notes that a reliable belief-forming process is one which generally produces true beliefs.

A unique consequence of reliabilism (and other forms of externalism) is that one can have a justified belief without knowing one is justified (this is not possible under most forms of epistemic internalism). In addition, we do not yet know which cognitive processes are in fact reliable, so anyone who embraces reliabilism must concede that we do not always know whether some of our beliefs are justified (even though there is a fact of the matter).

=== Responding to skepticism ===
==== Internalism ====
A common way for internalists to avoid global skepticism is to accept a version of what has been variously called the principle of credulity, the principle of rational credulity, and the critical trust approach. The former is the initial term used by Richard Swinburne, but Kai-Man Kwan's latter term has received more subsequent adoption as well.

The principle has been stated as:

If it seems (epistemically) that x is present on the basis of experience, then probably x is present unless there are special considerations to the contrary.

However, the principle has also been given in other glosses such as conferring prima facie justification for the belief and adding to the probability of the belief. A version can also be given as follows: if x appears to have y quality (e.g., designed), then that is reason to think x does have y quality. Whatever the exact version, it has been claimed that a principle like this is actually required for the internalist to avoid global skepticism.

A key point, however, is that this principle is not, as Kwan puts it, an "anything goes" approach. Rather, it recognizes the limitations of human beings and that what seems to be true can, in fact, not be true. That is where the "special considerations," such as certain undercutting and rebutting defeaters, come into play. As Kwan puts it: "The hope lies in the ability of man to sift and correct these initial data." Yet, according to those who accept the principle, by it global skepticism about the external world can be avoided.

==== Externalism ====
In responding to skepticism, Hilary Putnam (1982) claims that semantic externalism yields "an argument we can give that shows we are not brains in a vat (BIV). (See also DeRose, 1999.) If semantic externalism is true, then the meaning of a word or sentence is not wholly determined by what individuals think those words mean. For example, semantic externalists maintain that the word "water" referred to the substance whose chemical composition is H_{2}O even before scientists had discovered that chemical composition. The fact that the substance out in the world we were calling "water" actually had that composition at least partially determined the meaning of the word. One way to use this in a response to skepticism is to apply the same strategy to the terms used in a skeptical argument in the following way (DeRose, 1999):

Either I am a BIV, or I am not a BIV.

If I am not a BIV, then when I say "I am not a BIV", it is true.
If I am a BIV, then, when I say "I am not a BIV", it is true (because "brain" and "vat" would only pick out the brains and vats being simulated, not real brains and real vats).
---

My utterance of "I am not a BIV" is true.

To clarify how this argument is supposed to work: Imagine that there is brain in a vat, and a whole world is being simulated for it. Call the individual who is being deceived "Steve." When Steve is given an experience of walking through a park, semantic externalism allows for his thought, "I am walking through a park" to be true so long as the simulated reality is one in which he is walking through a park. Similarly, what it takes for his thought, "I am a brain in a vat," to be true is for the simulated reality to be one where he is a brain in a vat. But in the simulated reality, he is not a brain in a vat.

Apart from disputes over the success of the argument or the plausibility of the specific type of semantic externalism required for it to work, there is question as to what is gained by defeating the skeptical worry with this strategy. Skeptics can give new skeptical cases that wouldn't be subject to the same response (e.g., one where the person was very recently turned into a brain in a vat, so that their words "brain" and "vat" still pick out real brains and vats, rather than simulated ones). Further, if even brains in vats can correctly believe "I am not a brain in a vat," then the skeptic can still press us on how we know we are not in that situation (though the externalist will point out that it may be difficult for the skeptic to describe that situation).

Another attempt to use externalism to refute skepticism is done by Brueckner and Warfield. It involves the claim that our thoughts are about things, unlike a BIV's thoughts, which cannot be about things (DeRose, 1999).

== Semantics ==
Semantic externalism comes in two varieties, depending on whether meaning is construed cognitively or linguistically. On a cognitive construal, externalism is the thesis that what concepts (or contents) are available to a thinker is determined by their environment, or their relation to their environment. On a linguistic construal, externalism is the thesis that the meaning of a word is environmentally determined. Likewise, one can construe semantic internalism in two ways, as a denial of either of these two theses.

Externalism and internalism in semantics is closely tied to the distinction in philosophy of mind concerning mental content, since the contents of one's thoughts (specifically, intentional mental states) are usually taken to be semantic objects that are truth-evaluable.

See also:

- Linguistic turn for more about the two construals of meaning
- Swamp man thought experiment
- Twin Earth thought experiment

== Philosophy of mind ==
Within the context of the philosophy of mind, externalism is the theory that the contents of at least some of one's mental states are dependent in part on their relationship to the external world or one's environment.

The traditional discussion on externalism was centered around the semantic aspect of mental content. This is by no means the only meaning of externalism now. Externalism is now a broad collection of philosophical views considering all aspects of mental content and activity. There are various forms of externalism that consider either the content or the vehicles of the mind or both. Furthermore, externalism could be limited to cognition, or it could address broader issues of consciousness.

As to the traditional discussion on semantic externalism (often dubbed content externalism), some mental states, such as believing that water is wet, and fearing that the Queen has been insulted, have contents we can capture using 'that' clauses. The content externalist often appeal to observations found as early as Hilary Putnam's seminal essay, "The Meaning of 'Meaning'," (1975). Putnam stated that we can easily imagine pairs of individuals that are microphysical duplicates embedded in different surroundings who use the same words but mean different things when using them.

For example, suppose that Ike and Tina's mothers are identical twins and that Ike and Tina are raised in isolation from one another in indistinguishable environments. When Ike says, "I want my mommy," he expresses a want satisfied only if he is brought to his mommy. If we brought Tina's mommy, Ike might not notice the difference, but he doesn't get what he wants. It seems that what he wants and what he says when he says, "I want my mommy," will be different from what Tina wants and what she says she wants when she says, "I want my mommy."

Externalists say that if we assume competent speakers know what they think, and say what they think, the difference in what these two speakers mean corresponds to a difference in the thoughts of the two speakers that is not (necessarily) reflected by a difference in the internal make up of the speakers or thinkers. They urge us to move from externalism about meaning of the sort Putnam defended to externalism about contentful states of mind. The example pertains to singular terms, but has been extended to cover kind terms as well such as natural kinds (e.g., 'water') and for kinds of artifacts (e.g., 'espresso maker'). There is no general agreement amongst content externalists as to the scope of the thesis.

Philosophers now tend to distinguish between wide content (externalist mental content) and narrow content (anti-externalist mental content). Some, then, align themselves as endorsing one view of content exclusively, or both. For example, Jerry Fodor (1980) argues for narrow content (although he comes to reject that view in his 1995), while David Chalmers (2002) argues for a two dimensional semantics according to which the contents of mental states can have both wide and narrow content.

Critics of the view have questioned the original thought experiments saying that the lessons that Putnam and later writers such as Tyler Burge (1979, 1982) have urged us to draw can be resisted. Frank Jackson and John Searle, for example, have defended internalist accounts of thought content according to which the contents of our thoughts are fixed by descriptions that pick out the individuals and kinds that our thoughts intuitively pertain to the sorts of things that we take them to. In the Ike/Tina example, one might agree that Ike's thoughts pertain to Ike's mother and that Tina's thoughts pertain to Tina's but insist that this is because Ike thinks of that woman as his mother and we can capture this by saying that he thinks of her as 'the mother of the speaker'. This descriptive phrase will pick out one unique woman. Externalists claim this is implausible, as we would have to ascribe to Ike knowledge he wouldn't need to successfully think about or refer to his mother.

Critics have also claimed that content externalists are committed to epistemological absurdities. Suppose that a speaker can have the concept of water we do only if the speaker lives in a world that contains H_{2}O. It seems this speaker could know a priori that they think that water is wet. This is the thesis of privileged access. It also seems that they could know on the basis of simple thought experiments that they can only think that water is wet if they live in a world that contains water. What would prevent her from putting these together and coming to know a priori that the world contains water? If we should say that no one could possibly know whether water exists a priori, it seems either we cannot know content externalism to be true on the basis of thought experiments or we cannot know what we are thinking without first looking into the world to see what it is like.

As mentioned, content externalism (limited to the semantic aspects) is only one among many other options offered by externalism by and large.

See also:

- Twin Earth thought experiment
- Extended cognition

== Historiography of science ==
Internalism in the historiography of science claims that science is completely distinct from social influences and pure natural science can exist in any society and at any time given the intellectual capacity. Imre Lakatos is a notable proponent of historiographical internalism.

Externalism in the historiography of science is the view that the history of science is due to its social context – the socio-political climate and the surrounding economy determines scientific progress. Thomas Kuhn is a notable proponent of historiographical externalism.

== See also ==
- Anti-psychologism
- Dream argument
- Emic and etic
- Foundationalism
- Relativism
- Self-awareness
- Simulated reality
