= Alan Garfinkel =

University Professor

Alan Garfinkel is a professor at the University of California, Los Angeles in the departments of Medicine (Cardiology) and Integrative Biology and Physiology. His research work applies nonlinear dynamics to cardiac arrhythmias and to the creation of biological patterns in space and time. As a teacher, he created a new course to teach dynamics and modeling to biology students, with no "calculus" prerequisite.

== Early life and education ==
Alan Garfinkel was born in Brooklyn, New York. After attending public schools in New York City, he graduated from Cornell University in 1966 with a degree in Mathematics and Philosophy. After two years at MIT, he moved to Harvard University, where he earned a doctorate in philosophy in 1975.

== Research and career ==
In Garfinkel's PhD dissertation, written under Hilary Putnam, which Yale University Press published as Forms of Explanation, he proposed the notion of contrastive explanation, that an answer to the question "Why X?" is really an answer to "Why X rather than a limited set of alternatives to it?"

He became a cardiac researcher and modeler. He and his team identified mathematical (deterministic) chaos in a real rabbit cardiac arrhythmia, then used "chaos control" techniques to stabilize the arrhythmia into periodic beating. Using analytical techniques from nonlinear dynamics, he and his colleagues Zhilin Qu and James N. Weiss then demonstrated that ventricular fibrillation (VF), the primary cause of sudden cardiac death, is an example of deterministic spatiotemporal chaos, and devised and experimentally verified a mechanism to prevent VF.

His research interests include the electrophysiology of cells and tissues modeled mathematically, analysis of experimental and clinical arrhythmia data with techniques of nonlinear dynamics, and research and development of pharmacologic and electrophysiological therapies to prevent or regulate arrhythmias. He also studies the role of physiological and pathophysiological oscillations in biological systems, with a particular focus on the mechanisms of their creation and destruction, and the creation of normal and pathological patterns in biological systems.

He started his career as a professor of the philosophy of science at California State University, Northridge. Moving to the University of California, Los Angeles, he held a succession of positions leading to Professor of Medicine (Cardiology) and Integrative Biology and Physiology (2003–2018), where he is currently Research Professor and Professor Emeritus. In 2019–2020, he was Newton Abraham Visiting Professor in the Department of Computer Science and Lincoln College, University of Oxford.

== Awards and honors ==
Garfinkel has received awards including Astor Visiting Lecturer, University of Oxford, UCLA University Distinguished Teaching Award (2015) and many others. His text Modeling Life was awarded the Textbook Excellence Award of the Textbook and Academic Authors Association. His patents include "Real time stabilizing system for pulsating activity" (US5447520A).

== Books ==
- Modeling Life: The Mathematics of Biological Systems
- Forms of Explanation: Rethinking the Questions in Social Theory
- Understanding Data: A 21st Century Approach to Statistics and Data Science

== Publications ==
- Alan Garfinkel, Mark L Spano, William L Ditto, James N Weiss. Controlling Cardiac Chaos. Science.
- Alan Garfinkel, Young-Hoon Kim, Olga Voroshilovsky, Zhilin Qu, Jong R Kil, Moon- Hyoung Lee, Hrayr S Karagueuzian, James N Weiss, Peng-Sheng Chen. Preventing ventricular fibrillation by flattening cardiac restitution. Proceedings of the National Academy of Sciences.
- Alan Garfinkel, Peng-Sheng Chen, Donald O Walter, Hrayr S Karagueuzian, Boris Kogan, Steven J Evans, Mikhail Karpoukhin, Chun Hwang, Takumi Uchida, Masamichi Gotoh, Obi Nwasokwa, Philip Sager, James N Weiss. Quasiperiodicity and chaos in cardiac fibrillation. The Journal of Clinical Investigation.
- Alan Garfinkel, Yin Tintut, Danny Petrasek, Kristina Boström, Linda L Demer. Pattern formation by vascular mesenchymal cells. Proceedings of the National Academy of Sciences.
- Yina Guo, Ting-Hsuan Chen, Xingjuan Zeng, David Warburton, Kristina I. Boström, Chih-Ming Ho, Xin Zhao, and Alan Garfinkel. Branching patterns emerge in a mathematical model of the dynamics of lung development. Journal of Physiology.
- Lingyun (Ivy) Xiong and Alan Garfinkel. A common pathway to cancer: Oncogenic mutations abolish p53 oscillations. Progress in Biophysics and Molecular Biology.
- Lingyun (Ivy) Xiong and Alan Garfinkel. Are Physiological Oscillations Physiological? Journal of Physiology.
