= Mark Wilson (philosopher) =

American philosopher (b. 1947)

- Born: Mark Lowell Wilson; 1947 (age 78–79)

Education
- Education: Reed College; University of Washington; Harvard University (PhD, 1976)
- Doctoral advisor: Hilary Putnam

Philosophical work
- Era: Contemporary philosophy
- Region: Western philosophy
- Institutions: University of California, San Diego; University of Illinois at Chicago; Ohio State University; University of Pittsburgh
- Main interests: Philosophy of mathematics, of language, of science, of physics and metaphysics

Mark Lowell Wilson (born 1947) is an American philosopher and Distinguished Professor of Philosophy at University of Pittsburgh. Wilson has authored several books on the philosophy of mathematics.

== Education and early life ==
Wilson was raised in Oregon, and enrolled at Reed College between 1965 and 1967, before earning his bachelor's degree in 1969 from the University of Washington. He completed a doctorate at Harvard University in 1976, where his thesis was supervised by Hilary Putnam.

== Academic career ==
Before joining the University of Pittsburgh faculty, where he was named distinguished professor of philosophy in 2015, Wilson taught at the University of California, San Diego, University of Illinois at Chicago, and Ohio State University.

His research mainly focuses on how physical and mathematical concerns become entangled with metaphysics and philosophy of language. He has published several books, including Imitation of Rigor: An Alternate History of Analytic Philosophy, Innovation and Certainty, Wandering Significance: An Essay on Conceptual Behavior, and Physics Avoidance: and other essays in conceptual strategy. He is a Resident Fellow of the Center for Philosophy of Science at the University of Pittsburgh and a Fellow of the American Academy of Arts and Sciences.

== Bibliography ==
- Wilson, M. (2006). Wandering Significance: An Essay on Conceptual Behavior. Oxford University Press. ISBN 9780199532308.
- Wilson, M. (2018). Physics Avoidance: and Other Essays in Conceptual Strategy. Oxford University Press. ISBN 9780198803478.
- Wilson, M. (2020). Innovation and Certainty. Cambridge University Press. ISBN 978-1-108-66337-3. (part of the Cambridge Elements series)
- Wilson, M. (2022). Imitation of Rigor: An Alternative History of Analytic Philosophy. Oxford University Press. ISBN 9780192896469.
