= Twin Earth thought experiment =

Thought experiment proposed by Hilary Putnam

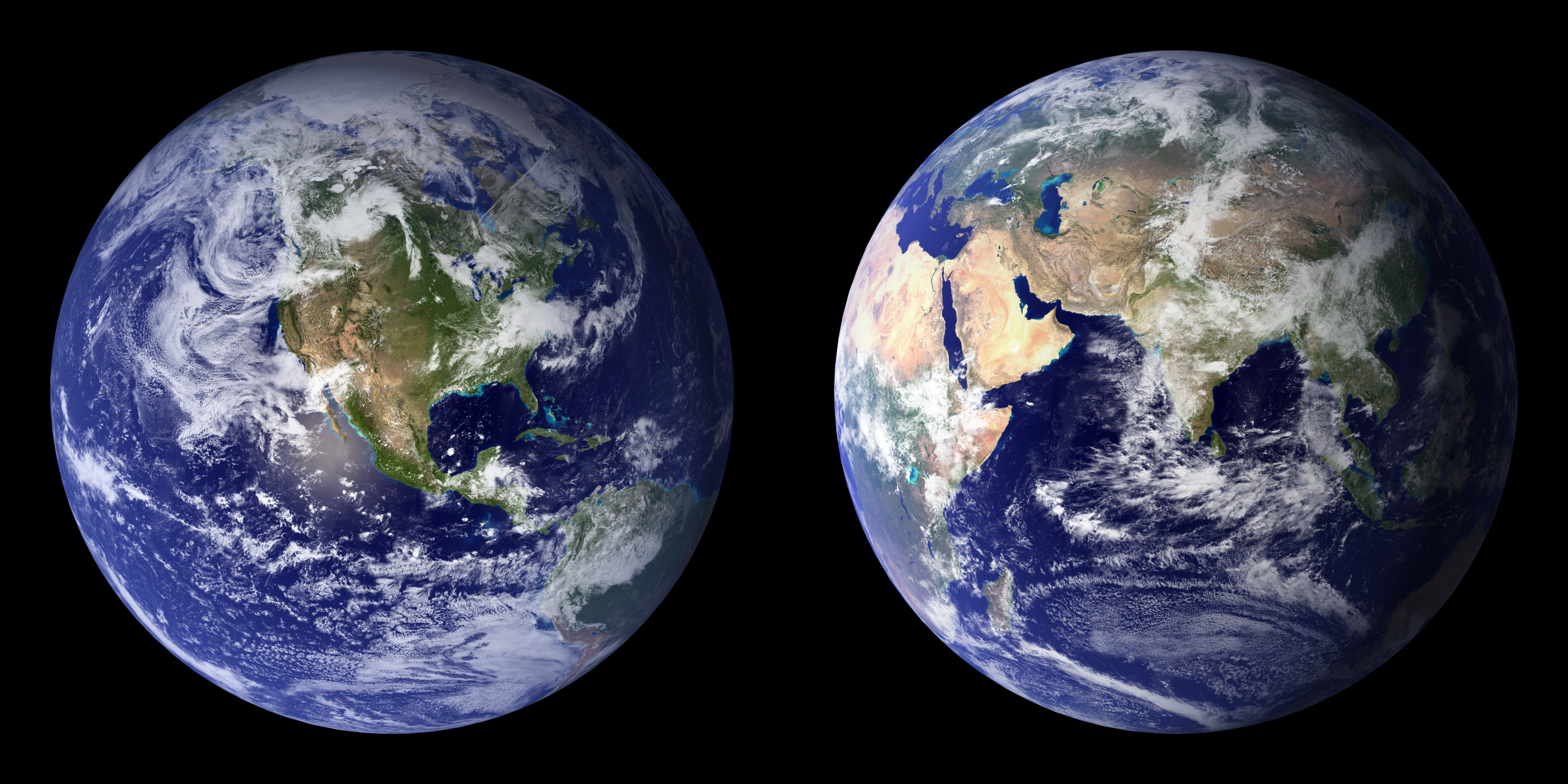
The Twin Earth thought experiment posits a second Earth which is identical in all ways except one.

Twin Earth is a thought experiment proposed by philosopher Hilary Putnam in his papers "Meaning and Reference" (1973) and "The Meaning of 'Meaning'" (1975). It is meant to serve as an illustration of his argument for semantic externalism, or the view that the meanings of words are not purely psychological. The Twin Earth thought experiment was one of three examples that Putnam offered in support of semantic externalism, the other two being what he called the Aluminum-Molybdenum case and the Beech-Elm case. Since the publication of these cases, numerous variations on the thought experiment have been proposed by philosophers.

== The thought experiment ==
Putnam's original formulation of the experiment was this: Elsewhere in the universe there is a planet exactly like Earth in virtually all aspects, which can be referred to as "Twin Earth". The relevant surroundings are exactly the same as for Earth; it revolves around a star that appears to be exactly like the Sun, and so on. On Twin Earth, there is a Twin equivalent of every person and thing here on Earth. The one difference between the two planets is that there is no water on Twin Earth. In its place there is a liquid that is superficially identical, but is chemically different, being composed not of H_{2}O, but rather of some more complicated formula which can be abbreviated as "XYZ". The Twin Earthlings who refer to their language as "English" call XYZ "water". Finally, the date of the thought experiment is several centuries ago, when the residents of Earth and Twin Earth would have no means of knowing that the liquids they called "water" were H_{2}O and XYZ respectively. The experience of people on Earth with water and that of those on Twin Earth with XYZ would be identical.

Now the question arises: when an Earthling (or Oscar for simplicity's sake) and his twin on Twin Earth say 'water', do they mean the same thing? The twin is also called 'Oscar' on his own planet, and the inhabitants of that planet call their planet 'Earth'. They are in identical psychological states, with the same thoughts, feelings, etc. Yet, at least according to Putnam, when Oscar says 'water', the term refers to H_{2}O, whereas when Twin Oscar says 'water' it refers to XYZ. The result of this is that the contents of a person's brain are not sufficient to determine the reference of terms they use, as observers must also examine the causal history that led to this individual acquiring the term. (Oscar, for instance, learned the word 'water' in a world filled with H_{2}O, whereas Twin Oscar learned 'water' in a world filled with XYZ.)

This is the essential thesis of semantic externalism. Putnam famously summarized this conclusion with the statement that "'meanings' just ain't in the head."

== Criticism ==
In his original article, Putnam had claimed that the reference of the twins' "water" varied even though their psychological states were the same. Tyler Burge subsequently argued in "Other Bodies" (1982) that the twins' mental states are different: Oscar has the concept H_{2}O, while Twin Oscar has the concept XYZ. Putnam has since expressed agreement with Burge's interpretation of the thought experiment. (See Putnam's introduction in Pessin and Goldberg 1996, xxi.)

A number of philosophers have argued that "water" for both Oscar and Twin Oscar refers to anything that is sufficiently water-like (i.e. the term's extension includes both H_{2}O and XYZ). They reject, therefore, the contention that "water" is a rigid designator referring to H_{2}O. John Searle, for example, argues (Intentionality: An Essay in the Philosophy of Mind) that, once we discover that our water is H_{2}O, we have the choice of either redefining it as H_{2}O (a classical reduction redefinition) or continuing to allow the term water to refer to anything with the basic properties of water (transparency, wetness, etc.). Searle suggests that in the Twin-Earth example, the second seems more plausible, since if Twin Earth doesn't have water, then all its water-based products will also be different. Twin ice cream, for example, will be constitutionally different, yet we will still be tempted to call it ice cream. Searle, along with others, considers this sufficient argument to "solve" the thought experiment altogether; others, such as Donald Davidson, feel that variations on the experiment can be used to draw some of the same conclusions.

Paul Boghossian raised an objection to the class of Twin-Earth-style arguments for externalism in the form of an argument that aims to show that externalism is incompatible with privileged self-knowledge. Here, privileged self-knowledge is taken to be the idea that one can know the content of one's thoughts without having to investigate the external world (for empirical evidence). Although this type of argument does not directly disprove externalism, it is pressing because of the intuitive plausibility of privileged self-knowledge's existence.

Some philosophers believe that such science-fiction thought experiments (like the Twin-Earth) should be examined carefully. They argue that when a thought experiment describes a state of affairs that is radically different from the actual one (or what we think it to be), our intuitions can become unreliable, and hence the philosophical conclusions drawn from them may also be unreliable. Daniel Dennett calls Twin Earth and other experiments like it "intuition pumps", as they are designed in such a way to allow the thinker to use their intuition to guide them through the problem. Some philosophers take the Twin-Earth thought experiment/intuition pump to engage faulty intuitions, and hence lead to faulty conclusions. Phil Hutchinson, for example, notes that a) if one looks at Putnam's own later criticisms of others (for example his criticisms of Jaegwon Kim in his book The Threefold Cord) one finds that implicitly he criticises his own earlier self; and b) that the persuasive power of the Twin Earth thought experiment/intuition pump relies on our turning a blind eye to aspects of the experiment in order that it establish that which Putnam claims it to. In short, the thought experiment is set up in such a way that one's intuitions will be pumped in the desired direction.

John McDowell, in his paper "Putnam on Mind and Meaning", criticised Putnam for still having in play a latent commitment to a picture of the mind as modelled on the brain and located in the head. Putnam has since conceded the point and subscribes to McDowell's neo-Wittgensteinian therapeutic invocation of the mind as a structured system of object involving abilities (what Putnam has since defended as a neo-Aristotelian picture of mind). Phil Hutchinson has since argued that this concession to McDowell means that the distinction which Putnam wishes to operationalize, between intension and extension, is now problematized.

John Dupré, in a number of papers and mainly in his paper "Natural Kinds and Biological Taxa", has demonstrated that the theory of natural kinds, which many have taken to be established and/or supported by Putnam's Twin Earth thought experiment does not find support in the practice of scientific classification. Avrum Stroll has produced probably the most comprehensive critique of the program of natural kind semantics (both Putnam's and Kripke's) in his book Sketches of Landscapes. Putnam, who is well known for changing his philosophical positions on a variety of issues, criticized the experiment later in life because it is anti-functionalist.

== See also ==
- Externalism
- Internalism and externalism
- Philosophy of language
- Semantic externalism
- Swampman
