= Sanford Goldberg =

American philosopher (born 1967)

- Born: 1967 (age 58–59)

Education
- Education: Columbia University (PhD)

Philosophical work
- Era: 21st-century philosophy
- Region: Western philosophy
- Institutions: Northwestern University
- Main interests: epistemology, philosophy of language, philosophy of mind
- Notable ideas: anti-individualism

Sanford Goldberg (born 1967) is an American philosopher and Chester D. Tripp Professor in the Humanities at Northwestern University. He is known for his works on epistemology, philosophy of language, and philosophy of mind.

== Books ==
- Conversational Pressure: Normativity in Speech Exchanges, Oxford University Press 2020
- To the Best of Our Knowledge: Social Expectations and Epistemic Normativity, Oxford University Press 2018
- Assertion: On the Philosophical Significance of Assertoric Speech. Oxford University Press 2015
- Relying on Others. Oxford University Press 2010.
- Anti-Individualism: Mind and Language, Knowledge and Justification. Cambridge University Press 2007
- The Brain in a Vat (ed.). Cambridge University Press 2016
- Externalism, Self-Knowledge, and Skepticism (ed.). Cambridge University Press 2015
- Internalism and Externalism in Semantics and Epistemology (ed.). Oxford University Press 2007
- Gray Matters: An Introduction to the Philosophy of Mind, with Andrew Pessin, M.E. Sharpe 1997
- The Twin Earth Chronicles, Co-edited with Andrew Pessin, Introduction by Hilary Putnam, M.E. Sharpe, 1996
