= J. Kevin O'Regan =

English psychologist

John Kevin O'Regan is an English psychologist. He is ex-director of the "Laboratoire de Psychologie de la Perception" at the Université René Descartes, Paris 5 (CNRS). He was the last director of the "Laboratoire de Psychologie Expérimentale" (Laboratory of Experimental Psychology) before its dissolution in 2006.

== Work ==
After studying theoretical physics at the University of Sussex and the University of Cambridge, O'Regan moved to Paris in 1975 to work in experimental psychology at the Centre National de Recherche Scientifique (CNRS).

Following his PhD on eye movement in reading he showed the existence of an optimal position for the eye to fixate in images and words. His interest in the problem of the perceived stability of the visual world led him to question established notions of the nature of visual perception, and to discover, with collaborators, the phenomenon of change blindness.

His current work, described in his book Why Red Doesn't Sound Like a Bell: Explaining the Feel of Consciousness (2011), involves exploring the empirical consequences of a new sensorimotor approach to vision and sensation in general. He is particularly interested in the problem of the nature of phenomenal consciousness, which he addresses experimentally in relation to sensory substitution, and theoretically in relation to color perception. He is interested in applying this work to robotics.

His work about phenomenal states exemplifying conscious conception of themselves has been used within R.A.Wilson externalist framework to ongoing research and debate within the study of consciousness (Boundaries of the Mind: The Individual in the Fragile Sciences, ISBN 978-0-521-54494-8, introducing the acronym TESEE: Temporally Extended, Scaffolded, and Embodied and Embedded).

== See also ==
- Analytic phenomenology

== Bibliography ==
- Why Red Doesn't Sound Like a Bell: Explaining the Feel of Consciousness, Oxford University Press, (June, 2011), ISBN 978-0-19-977522-4
