= Robert Wilson (philosopher) =

Australian philosopher (born 1964)

Robert A. Wilson
- Born: Robert Andrew Wilson; 1964 (age 61–62)

Education
- Education: University of Western Australia; Cornell University
- Academic advisor: Sydney Shoemaker

Philosophical work
- Era: Contemporary philosophy
- Region: Western philosophy
- School: Analytic philosophy
- Institutions: Queen's University; University of Illinois, Urbana-Champaign; University of Alberta; La Trobe University; University of Western Australia
- Main interests: Philosophy of science; Philosophy of biology; Philosophy of mind
- Notable works: Boundaries of the Mind

Robert Andrew Wilson FRSC (born 1964) is an Australian philosopher who has worked in Canada, the United States, and Australia. He has been professor of philosophy at the University of Western Australia since November 2019, after teaching previously at La Trobe University (2017–2019), the University of Alberta (from 2000 to 2017), the University of Illinois, Urbana-Champaign (1996–2001), where he was a member of the Cognitive Science Group at the Beckman Institute for Advanced Science and Technology, and at Queen's University (1992–1996).

== Early life and education ==
Wilson was born in Broken Hill, New South Wales, Australia, and grew up there and in Perth, Western Australia. He completed a BA(Hons) in Philosophy at the University of Western Australia (1985), and after working and travelling for a few years, his MA (1990) and PhD (1992) in Philosophy at Cornell University, minoring in Cognitive Studies, while a Fulbright Scholar.

== Career ==
Wilson's chief research and teaching expertise is in the philosophy of mind, cognitive science, and the philosophy of biology; he has also published on a broader range of topics outside of these areas, including disability, Locke on primary qualities, personal identity, constitution views in metaphysics, and kinship. In general, his work draws on connections between philosophy and the various sciences. He is the author or editor of seven books, including Boundaries of the Mind (Cambridge, 2004), Genes and the Agents of Life (Cambridge, 2005), and The Eugenic Mind Project (MIT Press, 2018). With the developmental psychologist Frank Keil, he was also the general editor of The MIT Encyclopedia of the Cognitive Sciences (MIT Press, 1999).

Wilson was the founding Director of Philosophy for Children Alberta (2008–2015) and the principal investigator for the Living Archives on Eugenics in Western Canada project (2010–2015, see www.eugenicsarchive.ca ) a 5-year project funded by the Community-Research Alliance Program of the Social Sciences and Humanities Research Council of Canada (SSHRC). He was also a professor in Educational Policy Studies at the University of Alberta from 2013 to 2015, chiefly due to his involvement in philosophy for children. In 2009, he was elected as a Fellow of the Royal Society of Canada. His mentoring of students, postdoctoral fellows, and other early career scholars ranges across all areas in which he has worked.
