= Semantic externalism =

Concept in the philosophy of language

In the philosophy of language, semantic externalism (the opposite of semantic internalism) is the view that the meaning of a term is determined, in whole or in part, by factors external to the speaker. According to an externalist position, one can claim without contradiction that two speakers could be in exactly the same brain state at the time of an utterance, and yet mean different things by that utterance – that is, at the least, that their terms could pick out different referents.

== Overview ==
The philosopher Hilary Putnam (1975/1985) proposed this position and summarized it with the statement "meanings just ain't in the head!"

Although he did not use the term "externalism" at the time, Putnam is thought to have pioneered semantic externalism in his 1975 paper "The Meaning of 'Meaning'". His Twin Earth thought experiment, from the aforementioned paper, is widely cited to illustrate his argument for externalism to this day. Alongside Putnam, credit also goes to Saul Kripke and Tyler Burge, both of whom attacked internalism for independent reasons, providing a foundation on which Putnam's attacks rested.

Externalism is generally thought to be a necessary consequence of any causal theory of reference; since the causal history of a term is not internal, the involvement of that history in determining the term's referent is enough to satisfy the externalist thesis. However, Putnam and many subsequent externalists have maintained that not only reference, but sense as well is determined, at least in part, by external factors (see sense and reference).

While it is common to shorten "semantic externalism" to "externalism" within the context of the debate, one must be careful in doing so, as there are several distinct debates in philosophy that employ the terms "externalism" and "internalism".

== Arguments for externalism ==
Putnam presented a variety of arguments for the externalist position, the most famous being those that concerned Twin Earth. Subsequent philosophers have produced other, related thought experiments, most notably Donald Davidson's swamp man experiment. However, there have been numerous arguments for externalism that do not involve science-fiction scenarios.

Putnam pointed out, for instance, that he has no knowledge that could distinguish elm trees from beech trees. He has precisely the same concept of one as of the other: "a deciduous tree growing in North America". Yet when Putnam makes a statement containing the word "elm", we take him to be referring specifically to elms. If he makes a claim about a property of elm trees, it will be considered true or false, depending upon whether that property applies to those trees which are in fact elms. There is nothing "in the head" that could fix his reference thus; rather, he concluded, his linguistic community, containing some speakers who did know the difference between the two trees, ensured that when he said "elm", he referred to elms. Putnam refers to this feature of language as "the division of linguistic labor".

== See also ==
- Ideational theory of meaning
- Semantic externalism as a response to skepticism
- Reference theory of meaning
- Swampman
