= Tyler Burge =

American philosopher (born 1946)

- Born: 1946 (age 79–80)

Education
- Education: Wesleyan University; Princeton University
- Doctoral advisor: John Wallace
- Other advisor: Donald Davidson

Philosophical work
- Era: Contemporary philosophy
- Region: Western philosophy
- School: Analytic
- Institutions: UCLA
- Doctoral students: Linda Zagzebski
- Notable students: Michel Seymour
- Main interests: Philosophy of language; philosophy of mind; epistemology
- Notable ideas: Anti-individualism

Tyler Burge (/bɜːrdʒ/; born 1946) is an American philosopher who is a Distinguished Professor of Philosophy at UCLA. Burge has made contributions to many areas of philosophy, including the philosophy of mind, philosophy of logic, epistemology, philosophy of language, and the history of philosophy.

== Education and career ==
In 1967, Burge received his bachelor of arts from Wesleyan University. He earned his PhD in philosophy from Princeton University in 1971 where he worked with Donald Davidson and John Wallace. He joined the UCLA faculty that year (1971), and has taught there ever since, with visiting professorships also at Stanford University, Harvard University, and MIT. He is an elected Fellow of the American Academy of Arts and Sciences since 1993 and a Corresponding Fellow of the British Academy since 1999. In 2007, he was elected to the American Philosophical Society. He was the recipient of the 2010 Jean Nicod Prize.

== Philosophical work ==
=== Anti-individualism ===
Burge has argued for anti-individualism. In Burge's words, anti-individualism is a theory that asserts the following: "individuating many of a person or animal’s mental kinds … is necessarily dependent on relations that the person bears to the physical, or in some cases social, environment". This view, and some variants, has been called "content externalism", or just "externalism." Burge favors "anti-individualism" over this terminology, in part because he considers the central issue to be what individuates content, rather than where contents may be located, as "externalism" may suggest. (Burge 2003, 435–6).

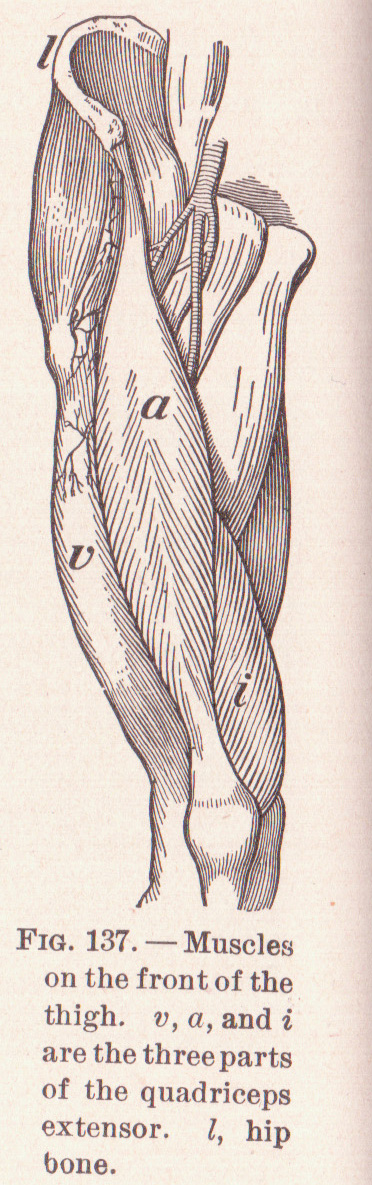
The patient's belief that arthritis is in his thigh depends on conventional meaning as determined by the linguistic community.

Burge argues in a similar fashion that a person's beliefs are dependent on the physical world. In his thought experiment, he attempted to demonstrate that all thoughts and beliefs have wide contents.

In "The Meaning of Meaning" (1975), Putnam argued that the meaning of a natural kind term such as "water" depends on the nature of the physical world. Burge argues that the difference in the thoughts is attributable to the difference between the nature of stuffs in the respective physical environments. As with the "arthritis" thought experiment, dependence of thought on the physical environment is a conclusion that is supposed to follow purely from reflection on the cases in the thought experiment.

Burge has extended the thesis of anti-individualism into the realm of the theory of vision, arguing that the contents of representations posited by a computational theory of vision, such as that pioneered by David Marr, are dependent on the environment of the organism's evolutionary history. (See Burge 1986.)

Anti-individualism about thoughts is a controversial thesis. It has been disputed on a number of grounds. For example, it has been claimed that the thesis undermines a person's authoritative knowledge of their own thought contents. (See, e.g., McKinsey 1991.) It has also been thought to cause problems for our understanding of the way that mental states cause behavior. (See, e.g., Fodor 1991.) Burge (1988) has argued that anti-individualism is compatible with knowledge of our own mental states. He has also argued that it presents no problems for our understanding of causation. (See Burge 1989.)

=== Origins of Objectivity ===
Burge published his first book-length monograph, Origins of Objectivity, in 2010, offering a philosophical account of perception heavily informed by empirical psychology. The book was described by one reviewer as "an absolutely terrific work, conceived and executed at a scale and level of ambition rarely seen in contemporary philosophy." Another reviewer described it as "imperious" and "poorly written", offering "broad but shallow surveys of the sensory and perceptual powers of animals and infants".

=== Other philosophical work ===
In the history of philosophy, Burge has published articles on the philosophy of Gottlob Frege and René Descartes. A collection of his writings on Frege, along with a substantial introduction and several postscripts by the author, has been published (Burge, 2005). In epistemology, he has written on such topics as self-knowledge, interlocution, reasoning and memory, as well as on self-reflection (Burge 2013). He is perhaps most well known for his contributions to the philosophy of mind, including his views on de re belief and, most notably, anti-individualism with respect to mental content, which is also known as externalism, the view that the content of one's thoughts depends partly on the external environment. A festschrift devoted mostly to Burge's work on anti-individualism, including extensive replies from Burge to the contributors, has also appeared (Hahn and Ramberg 2003). Since 1978, four of Burge's articles have been chosen as among "the ten best" of the year by The Philosopher's Annual.

== Bibliography ==
=== Books ===
- 2005. Truth, Thought, Reason: Essays on Frege. Oxford University Press, ISBN 0-19-927853-9.
- 2007. Foundations of Mind. Oxford University Press, ISBN 0-19-921623-1.
- 2010. Origins of Objectivity. Oxford University Press, ISBN 978-0-19-958140-5.
- 2013. Cognition Through Understanding: Self-Knowledge, Interlocution, Reasoning, Reflection. Oxford University Press, ISBN 978-0-19-967203-5.
- 2022. Perception: First Form of Mind. Oxford University Press, ISBN 978-0-19-887100-2.

=== Articles (selected) ===
- 1977. "Belief De Re". The Journal of Philosophy, Vol. 74, No. 6, pp. 338–362.
- 1979. "Sinning against Frege". The Philosophical Review, Vol. 88, No. 3, pp. 398–432.
- 1979. "Individualism and the Mental". Midwest Studies in Philosophy 4: 73–121.
- 1982. "Other Bodies". In Woodfield, Andrew, ed., Thought and Object. New York: Oxford.
- 1986. "Individualism and Psychology." Philosophical Review 45: 3-45.
- 1986. "Frege on Truth". in Haaparanta & Hintikka (1986).
- 1986. "Intellectual Norms and Foundations of Mind". The Journal of Philosophy, Vol. 83, No. 12, pp. 697–720.
- 1988. "Individualism and Self-Knowledge". The Journal of Philosophy 85: 649–663.
- 1989. "Individuation and Causation in Psychology". Pacific Philosophical Quarterly 70: 303–322.
- 1990. "Frege on Sense and Linguistic Meaning". in Bell & Cooper (1990).
- 1992. "Frege on Knowing the Third Realm". Mind, Vol. 101, pp. 633–650.12, pp. 697–720.
- 1993. "Content Preservation". The Philosophical Review, Vol. 102, No. 4, pp. 457–488.
- 1996. "Our Entitlement to Self-Knowledge". Proceedings of the Aristotelian Society, New Series, Vol. 96 (1996), pp. 91–116.
- 2003. "Reply to Loar". In Hahn and Ramberg (1991).
- 2003. "Perceptual Entitlement". Philosophy and Phenomenological Research, Vol. 67, pp. 503–548.
- 2003. "Memory and Persons". The Philosophical Review, Vol. 112, No. 3, pp. 289–337.

== References and further reading ==
- Bell, David & Cooper, Neil (eds.). 1990. The Analytic Tradition, Oxford: Blackwell.
- Fodor, Jerry. 1991. "A Modal Argument for Narrow Content". The Journal of Philosophy, Vol. 88, No. 1, pp. 5–26.
- Haaparanta, Leila & Hintikka, Jaakko (eds.). 1986. Frege Synthesized. Boston: D. Reidel.
- Hahn, Martin and Bjørn Ramberg (eds.). 2003. Reflections and Replies: Essays on the Philosophy of Tyler Burge. Cambridge, MA: MIT Press.
- McKinsey, Michael. 1991. "Anti-Individualism and Privileged Access". Analysis 51: 9–16.
- Maria J. Frapolli and Esther Romero (eds.). 2003. Meaning, Basic Self-Knowledge, and Mind: Essays on Tyler Burge, CSLI Publications, ISBN 1-57586-346-4.
