= Externalism =

Group of positions in the philosophy of mind

Externalism is a group of positions in the philosophy of mind which argues that the conscious mind is not only the result of what is going on inside the nervous system (or the brain), but also what occurs or exists outside the subject. It is contrasted with internalism which holds that the mind emerges from neural activity alone. Externalism is a belief that the mind is not just the brain or functions of the brain.

There are different versions of externalism based on different beliefs about what the mind is taken to be. Externalism stresses factors external to the nervous system. At one extreme, the mind could possibly depend on external factors. At the opposite extreme, the mind necessarily depends on external factors. The extreme view of externalism argues either that the mind is constituted by or identical with processes partially or totally external to the nervous system.

Another important criterion in externalist theory is to which aspect of the mind is addressed. Some externalists focus on cognitive aspects of the mind – such as Andy Clark and David Chalmers, Shaun Gallagher and many others – while others engage either the phenomenal aspect of the mind or the conscious mind itself. Several philosophers consider the conscious phenomenal content and activity, such as William Lycan, Alex Byrne or Francois Tonneau; Teed Rockwell or Riccardo Manzotti.

== Semantic externalism ==
Semantic externalism is the first form of externalism which was dubbed so. As the name suggests it focuses on mental content of semantic nature.

Semantic externalism suggests that the mental content does not supervene on what is in the head. Yet the physical basis and mechanisms of the mind remain inside the head. This is a relatively safe move since it does not jeopardize our beliefs of being located inside our cranium. Hilary Putnam focused particularly on intentionality between our thoughts and external state of affairs – whether concepts or objects. To defend his position, Putnam developed the famous Twin Earth thought experiment. Putnam expressed his view with the slogan "'meanings' just ain't in the head."

In contrast, Tyler Burge emphasized the social nature of the external world suggesting that semantic content is externally constituted by means of social, cultural, and linguistic interactions.

== Phenomenal externalism ==
Phenomenal externalism extends the externalist view to phenomenal content. Fred Dretske (Dretske 1996) suggested that "The experiences themselves are in the head (why else would closing one's eyes or stopping one's ears extinguish them?), but nothing in the head (indeed, at the time one is having the experiences, nothing outside the head) need have the qualities that distinguish these experiences." (Dretske 1996, p. 144-145). So, although experiences remain in the head, their phenomenal content could depend on something elsewhere.

In similar way, William Lycan defended an externalist and representationalist view of phenomenal experience. In particular, he objected to the tenet that qualia are narrow.

It has been often held that some, if not all, of mental states must have a broad content, that is an external content to their vehicles. For instance, Frank Jackson and Philip Pettit stated that "The contents of certain intentional states are broad or context-bound. The contents of some beliefs depend on how things are outside the subject" (Jackson and Pettit 1988, p. 381)

However, neither Dretske nor Lycan go far as to claim that the phenomenal mind extends literally and physically beyond the skin. In sum they suggest that phenomenal contents could depend on phenomena external to the body, while their vehicles remains inside.

== The extended mind ==
The extended mind model suggests that cognition is larger than the body of the subject. According to such a model, the boundaries of cognitive processes are not always inside the skin. "Minds are composed of tools for thinking" (Dennett 2000, p. 21). According to Andy Clark, "cognition leaks out into body and world". The mind then is no longer inside the skull, but it is extended to comprehend whatever tools are useful (ranging from notepad and pencils up to smartphones and USB memories). This, in a nutshell, is the model of the extended mind.

When someone uses pencil and paper to compute large sums, cognitive processes extend to the pencil and paper themselves. In a loose sense, nobody would deny it. In a stronger sense, it can be controversial whether the boundaries of the cognitive mind would extend to the pencil and paper. For most of the proponents of the extended mind, the phenomenal mind remains inside the brain. While commenting on Andy Clark's last book Supersizing the Mind, David Chalmers asks "what about the big question: extended consciousness? The dispositional beliefs, cognitive processes, perceptual mechanisms, and moods […] extend beyond the borders of consciousness, and it is plausible that it is precisely the nonconscious part of them that is extended." (Chalmers 2009, p. xiv)

== Enactivism and embodied cognition ==
Enactivism and embodied cognition stress the tight coupling between the cognitive processes, the body, and the environment. Enactivism builds upon the work of other scholars who could be considered as proto externalists; these include Gregory Bateson, James J. Gibson, Maurice Merleau-Ponty, Eleanor Rosch and many others. These thinkers suggest that the mind is either dependent on or identical with the interactions between the world and the agents. For instance, Kevin O'Regan and Alva Noë suggested in a seminal paper that the mind is constituted by the sensory-motor contingency between the agent and the world. A sensory-motor contingency is an occasion to act in a certain way and it results from the matching between environmental and bodily properties. To a certain extent, a sensory-motor contingency strongly resembles Gibson's affordances. Eventually, Noe developed a more epistemic version of enactivism where the content is the knowledge the agent has as to what it can do in a certain situation. In any case he is an externalist when he claims that "What perception is, however, is not a process in the brain, but a kind of skilful activity on the part of the animal as a whole. The enactive view challenges neuroscience to devise new ways of understanding the neural basis of perception and consciousness" (Noë 2004, p. 2). Recently, Noe published a more popular and shorter version of his position.

Enactivism receives support from various other correlated views such as embodied cognition or situated cognition. These views are usually the result of the rejection of the classic computational view of the mind which is centered on the notion of internal representations. Enactivism receives its share of negative comments, particularly from neuroscientists such as Christof Koch (Koch 2004, p. 9): "While proponents of the enactive point of view rightly emphasize that perception usually takes place within the context of action, I have little patience for their neglect of the neural basis of perception. If there is one thing that scientists are reasonably sure of, it is that brain activity is both necessary and sufficient for biological sentience."

To recap, enactivism is a case of externalism, sometimes restricted to cognitive or semantic aspects, some other times striving to encompass phenomenal aspects. Something that no enactivist has so far claimed is that all phenomenal content is the result of the interaction with the environment.

== Recent forms of phenomenal externalism ==
Some externalists suggest explicitly that phenomenal content as well as the mental process are partially external to the body of the subject. The authors considering these views wonder whether not only cognition but also the conscious mind could be extended in the environment. While enactivism, at the end of the day, accepts the standard physicalist ontology that conceives the world as made of interacting objects, these more radical externalists consider the possibility that there is some fundamental flaw in our way to conceive reality and that some ontological revision is indeed unavoidable.

Professor Teed Rockwell published a wholehearted attack against all forms of dualism and internalism. He proposed that the mind emerges not entirely from brain activity but from an interacting nexus of brain, body, and world. He therefore endorses embodied cognition, holding that neuroscience wrongly endorses a form of Cartesian materialism, an indictment also issued by many others. Dwelling on John Dewey's heritage, he argues that the brain and the body bring into existence the mind as a "behavioral field" in the environment.

Ted Honderich is perhaps the philosopher with the greatest experience in the field. He defends a position he himself dubbed "radical externalism" perhaps because of its ontological consequences. One of his main examples is that "what it actually is for you to be aware of the room you are in, it is for the room a way to exist." According to him, "Phenomenologically, what it is for you to be perceptually conscious is for a world somehow to exist". Therefore, he identifies existence with consciousness.

Another radical form of phenomenal externalism is the view called the spread mind by professor Riccardo Manzotti. He questions the separation between subject and object, seeing these as only two incomplete perspectives and descriptions of the same physical process. He supports a process ontology that endorses a mind spread physically and spatio-temporally beyond the skin. Objects are not autonomous as we know them, but rather actual processes framing our reality.

Another explanation was proposed by researcher-anthropologist Roger Bartra with his theory of the exocerebrum. He explains that consciousness is both inside and outside the brain, and that the frontier that separates both realms is useless and a burden in the explanation of the self. In his Anthropology of the Brain: Consciousness, Culture, and Free Will (Cambridge University Press, 2014; originally published in Spanish in 2005) he criticizes both externalism and internalism.

== See also ==
- Extelligence
- Foundationalism
- Hard problem of consciousness
