= Natural kind =

Concept in the philosophy of science

In the philosophy of science and some other branches of philosophy, a "natural kind" is an intellectual grouping, or categorizing of things, that is reflective of the actual world and not just human interests. Some treat it as a classification identifying some structure of truth and reality that exists whether or not humans recognize it. Others treat it as intrinsically useful to the human mind, but not necessarily reflective of something more objective. Candidate examples of natural kinds are found in all the sciences, but the field of chemistry provides the paradigm example of elements. Alexander Bird and Emma Tobin see natural kinds as relevant to metaphysics, epistemology, and the philosophy of language, as well as the philosophy of science.

John Dewey held a view that belief in unconditional natural kinds is a mistake, a relic of obsolete scientific practices. Hilary Putnam rejects descriptivist approaches to natural kinds with semantic reasoning. Richard Boyd holds that many natural kinds are homeostatic property clusters, families of properties whose co-occurrence is maintained by causal mechanisms. Hasok Chang and Rasmus Winther hold the emerging view that natural kinds are useful and evolving scientific facts.

== John Dewey ==
In 1938, John Dewey published Logic: The Theory of Inquiry, where he explained how modern scientists create kinds through induction and deduction, and why they have no use for natural kinds.

The philosophical issue is how humans can dependably predict that unobserved examples of a kind will have the same traits as a few observed examples. The traditional answer grew out of Aristotle's assertion that humans describe things they know in two kinds of propositions. Existential kinds—known by observing traits—are stated in "generic" propositions. Conceptual kinds—known by intuitive recognition of groups of traits—are stated in "universal" propositions.

Dewey argued that modern scientists do not follow Aristotle in treating inductive and deductive propositions as facts already known about nature's stable structure. Today, scientific propositions are intermediate steps in inquiry, hypotheses about processes displaying stable patterns. Aristotle's generic and universal propositions have become conceptual tools of inquiry warranted by inductive inclusion and exclusion of traits. They are provisional means rather than results of inquiry revealing the structure of reality.

Propositions as such are ... provisional, intermediate and instrumental. Since their subject-matter concerns two kinds of means, material and procedural, they are of two main categories: (1) Existential [generic means, known by induction], referring directly to actual conditions, as determined by experimental observation, and (2) ideational or conceptual [universal means, known by deduction], consisting of interrelated meanings, which are non-existential in content ... but which are applicable to existence through the operations they represent as possibilities.

Modern induction starts with a question to be answered or a problem to be solved. It identifies problematic subject-matter and seeks potentially relevant traits and conditions. Generic existential data thus identified are reformulated—stated abstractly as if-then universal relations capable of serving as answers or solutions: If $H_2 O$, then water. For Dewey, induction creates warranted kinds by observing constant conjunction of relevant traits.

No grounded generic propositions can be formed save as they are the products of the performance of operations indicated as possible by universal propositions. The problem of inference is, accordingly, to discriminate and conjoin those qualities [kinds] of existential material that serve as distinguishing traits (inclusively and exclusively) of a determinate kind.

Dewey used the example of "morning dew" to describe these abstract steps creating scientific kinds. From antiquity, the common-sense belief had been that all dew is a kind of rain, meaning dew drops fall. By the early 1800s the curious absence of rain before dew and the growth of understanding led scientists to examine new traits. Functional processes changing bodies [kinds] from solid to liquid to gas at different temperatures, and operational constants of conduction and radiation, led to new inductive hypotheses "directly suggested by this subject-matter, not by any data [kinds] previously observable. ... There were certain [existential] conditions postulated in the content of the new [non-existential] conception about dew, and it had to be determined whether these conditions were satisfied in the observable facts of the case."

After demonstrating that dew could be formed by these generic existential phenomena, and not by other phenomena, the universal hypothesis arose that dew forms following established laws of temperature and pressure. "The outstanding conclusion is that inductive procedures are those which prepare existential material so that it has convincing evidential weight with respect to an inferred generalization. Existential data are not pre-known natural kinds, but become conceptual statements of "natural" processes.

Objects and qualities [kinds] as they naturally present themselves or as they are "given," are not only not the data of science but constitute the most direct and important obstacles to formation of those ideas and hypotheses that are genuinely relevant and effective.
We are brought to the conclusion that it is modes of active response which are the ground of generality of logical form, not the existential immediate qualities of that which is responded to.

Dewey concluded that nature is not a collection of natural kinds, but rather of reliable processes discoverable by competent induction and deduction. He replaced the ambiguous label "natural kind" with "warranted assertion" to emphasize the conditional nature of all human knowings. Assuming kinds to be given unconditional knowings leads to the error of assuming that conceptual universal propositions can serve as evidence for generic propositions; observed consequences affirm unobservable imagined causes. "For an 'inference' that is not grounded in the evidential nature of the material from which it is drawn is not an inference. It is a more or less wild guess." Modern induction is not a guess about natural kinds, but a means to create instrumental understanding.

== Willard Van Orman Quine ==
In 1969, Willard Van Orman Quine brought the term "natural kind" into contemporary analytic philosophy with an essay bearing that title. His opening paragraph laid out his approach in three parts. First, it questioned the logical and scientific legitimacy of reasoning inductively by counting a few examples posting traits imputed to all members of a kind: "What tends to confirm an induction?" For Quine, induction reveals warranted kinds by repeated observation of visible similarities. Second, it assumed that color can be a characteristic trait of natural kinds, despite some logical puzzles: hypothetical colored kinds such as non-black non-ravens and green-blue emeralds. Finally, it suggested that human psychological structure can explain the illogical success of induction: "an innate flair that we have for natural kinds".

He started with the logical hypothesis that, if all ravens are black—an observable natural kind—then non-black non-ravens are equally a natural kind: "... each [observed] black raven tends to confirm the law [universal proposition] that all ravens are black ..." Observing shared generic traits warrants the inductive universal prediction that future experience will confirm the sharing: "And every reasonable [universal] expectation depends on resemblance of [generic] circumstances, together with our tendency to expect similar causes to have similar effects." "The notion of a kind and the notion of similarity or resemblance seem to be variants or adaptations of a single [universal] notion. Similarity is immediately definable in terms of kind; for things are similar when they are two of a kind."

Quine posited an intuitive human capacity to recognize criteria for judging degrees of similarity among objects, an "innate flair for natural kinds”. These criteria work instrumentally when applied inductively: "... why does our innate subjective spacing [classification] of [existential] qualities accord so well with the functionally relevant [universal] groupings in nature as to make our inductions tend to come out right?"

He admitted that generalizing after observing a few similarities is scientifically and logically unjustified. The numbers and degrees of similarities and differences humans experience are infinite. But the method is justified by its instrumental success in revealing natural kinds. The "problem of induction" is how humans "should stand better than random or coin-tossing chances of coming out right when we predict by inductions which are based on our innate, scientifically unjustified similarity standards."

A standard of similarity is in some sense innate. This point is not against empiricism; it is a commonplace of behavioral psychology. A response to a red circle, if it is rewarded, will be elicited by a pink eclipse more readily than by a blue triangle; the red circle resembles the pink ellipse more than the blue triangle. Without some such prior spacing of qualities, we could never acquire a [classification] habit; all stimuli would be equally alike and equally different.

Quine credited human ability to recognize colors as natural kinds to the evolutionary function of color in human survival—distinguishing safe from poisonous kinds of food. He recognized that modern science often judges color similarities to be superficial, but denied that equating existential similarities with abstract universal similarities makes natural kinds any less permanent and important. The human brain's capacity to recognize abstract kinds joins the brain's capacity to recognize existential similarities.

Credit is due to man's inveterate ingenuity, or human sapience, for having worked around the blinding dazzle of color vision and found the more significant regularities elsewhere. Evidently natural selection has dealt with the conflict [between visible and invisible similarities] by endowing man doubly: with both a color-slanted quality space and the ingenuity to rise above it.
He has risen above it by developing modified systems of kinds, hence modified similarity standards for scientific purposes. By the [inductive] trial-and-error process of theorizing he has regrouped things into new kinds which prove to lend themselves to many inductions better than the old.
A man's judgments of similarity do and should depend on his theory [universal propositions], on his beliefs; but similarity itself, what the man's judgments purport to be judgments of, [is] an objective relation in the world. It belongs in the [generic] subject matter not of our [universal] theory ... about the world, but of our [universal] theory of the [generic] world itself. Such would be the acceptable and reputable sort of similarity concept, if it could be defined.

Quine argued that the success of innate and learned criteria for classifying kinds on the basis of similarities observed in small samples of kinds, constitutes evidence of the existence of natural kinds; observed consequences affirm imagined causes. His reasoning continues to provoke philosophical debates.

== Hilary Putnam ==
In 1975, Hilary Putnam rejected descriptivist ideas about natural kind by elaborating on semantic concepts in language. Putnam explains his rejection of descriptivist and traditionalist approaches to natural kinds with semantic reasoning, and insists that natural kinds can not be thought of via descriptive processes or creating endless lists of properties.

In Putnam's Twin Earth thought experiment, one is asked to consider the extension of "water" when confronted with an alternate version of "water" on an imagined "Twin Earth". This "water" is composed of chemical XYZ, as opposed to H_{2}O. However, in all other describable aspects, it is the same as Earth’s "water." Putnam argues that the mere descriptions of an object, such as "water", is insufficient in defining natural kind. There are underlying aspects, such as chemical composition, that may go unaccounted for unless experts are consulted. This information provided by experts is what Putnam argues will ultimately define natural kinds.

Putnam calls the essential information used to define natural kind "core facts." This discussion arises in part in response to what he refers to as "Quine’s pessimism" of theory of meaning. Putnam claims that a natural kind can be referred to via its associated stereotype. This stereotype must be a normal member of the category, and is itself defined by core facts as determined by experts. By conveying these core facts, the essential and appropriate use of natural kind terms can be conveyed.

The process of conveying core facts to communicate the essence and appropriate term of a natural kind term is shown in Putnam's example of describing a lemon and a tiger. With a lemon, it is possible to communicate the stimulus-meaning of what a lemon is by simply showing someone a lemon. In the case of a tiger, on the other hand, it is considerably more complicated to show someone a tiger, but a speaker can just as readily explain what a tiger is by communicating its core facts. By conveying the core facts of a tiger (e.g. big cat, four legs, orange, black stripes, etc.), the listener can, in theory, go on to use the word "tiger" correctly and refer to its extension accurately.

== Richard Boyd ==
Beginning with a 1988 essay on moral realism, Richard Boyd argued that many natural kinds are homeostatic property clusters: families of properties that co-occur because underlying mechanisms maintain the clustering, with no property necessary for membership. On this view the naturalness of a kind consists in its aptness for induction and explanation rather than in any shared essence, so vague boundaries and borderline cases are expected rather than defective. Boyd developed the account chiefly for biological species. P. D. Magnus has argued that the account is better read as giving the ontological basis of some natural kinds than as defining natural kinds as such, since electrons are natural kinds without being homeostatic property clusters.

== Hilary Kornblith ==
In 1993, Hilary Kornblith published a review of debates about natural kinds since Quine had launched that epistemological project a quarter-century earlier. He evaluated Quine's "picture of natural knowledge" as natural kinds, along with subsequent refinements.

He found still acceptable Quine's original assumption that discovering knowledge of mind-independent reality depends on inductive generalisations based on limited observations, despite its being illogical. Equally acceptable was Quine's further assumption that instrumental success of inductive reasoning confirms both the existence of natural kinds and the legitimacy of the method.

I argue that natural kinds make inductive knowledge of the world possible because the clustering of properties characteristic of natural kinds makes inferences from the presence of some of these properties to the presence of others reliable. Were it not for the existence of natural kinds and the causal structure they require, any attempt to infer the existence of some properties from the presence of others would be no more than quixotic; reliable inductive inference would be impossible. The [generic] causal structure of the world as exhibited in [universal] natural kinds thus provides the natural ground of inductive inference.

Quine's assumption of an innate human psychological process—"standard of similarity," "subjective spacing of qualities"—also remained unquestioned. Kornbluth strengthened this assumption with new labels for the necessary cognitive qualities: "native processes of belief acquisition," "the structure of human conceptual representation," "native inferential processes," "reasonably accurate detectors of covariation." "To my mind, the primary case to be made for the view that our [universal] psychological processes dovetail with the [generic] causal structure of the world comes ... from the success of science.

Kornblith denied that this logic makes human classifications the same as mind-independent classifications: "The categories of modern science, of course, are not innate." But he offered no explanation of how kinds that work conditionally can be distinguished from mind-independent unchanging kinds. .

If the scientific categories of mature sciences did not correspond, at least approximately, to real kinds in nature, but instead merely grouped objects together on the basis of salient observable properties which somehow answer to our interests, it would be utterly miraculous that inductions using these scientific categories tend to issue in accurate predictions. Inductive inference can only work ... if there is something in nature binding together the [generic] properties which we use to identify kinds. ... Unobservables [universal propositions] are then postulated to explain the constant conjunction of observable properties.
We approach the world by presupposing that it contains natural kinds. Our inferences depend on this presupposition,... This presupposition thus gives us a built-in advantage in understanding what the world is like, and thereby makes inductive understanding of the world a real possibility.
When a population [kind] is uniform with respect to some [generic] property, [inductive] inferences from small samples, and indeed, from a single case, are perfectly reliable. If I note that a [generic] sample of [universal] copper conducts electricity and straightaway conclude that all copper conducts electricity, then I will do just as well as someone ... checking a very large number of copper samples for their conductivity.

Kornblith didn't explain how tedious modern induction accurately generalizes from a few generic traits to all of some universal kind. He attributed such success to individual sensitivity that a single case is representative of all of a kind.

If we are sensitive to the situations in which a population is uniform with respect to some property, then making inferences on the basis of very small samples will be a reliable and efficient way to gain information about a population [natural kind].". He argued that even human infants are intuitively sensitive to natural classifications. : "From the beginning, children assume that the natural world is divided into kinds on the basis of underlying features which are responsible for their superficial similarities, and that these similarities are an uncertain guide to that real underlying structure."

Accepting intuition as a legitimate ground for inductive inferences from small samples, Kornblith criticized popular arguments by Amos Tversky and Daniel Kahneman that intuition is irrational. He continued to argue that traditional induction explains the success of modern science.

Our [universal] conceptual and inferential tendencies jointly conspire, at least roughly, to carve nature at its [generic] joints and project the features of a kind which are essential to it. This preestablished harmony between the [generic] causal structure of the world and the [universal] conceptual and inferential structure of our minds produces reliable inductive inference.

== Hasok Chang and Rasmus Winther ==
Hasok Chang and Rasmus Winther contributed essays to a collection entitled Natural Kinds and Classification in Scientific Practice, published in 2016. The editor of the collection, Catherine Kendig, argued for a modern meaning of natural kinds, rejecting Aristotelian classifications of objects according to their "essences, laws, sameness relations, fundamental properties ... and how these map out the ontological space of the world." She thus dropped the traditional supposition that natural kinds exist permanently and independently of human reasoning. She collected original works examining results of discipline-specific classifications of kinds: "the empirical use of natural kinds and what I dub 'activities of natural kinding' and 'natural kinding practices'." Her natural kinds include scientific disciplines themselves, each with its own methods of inquiry and classifications or taxonomies..

Chang's contribution displayed Kendig's "natural kinding activities" or "practice turn" by reporting classifications in the mature discipline of chemistry—a field renowned for examples of timeless natural kinds: "All water is H_{2}O;" "All gold has atomic number 79."

He explicitly rejected Quine's basic assumption that natural kinds are real generic objects. "When I speak of a (natural) kind in this chapter, I am referring to a [universal] classificatory concept, rather than a collection of objects." His kinds result from humanity's continuous knowledge-seeking activities called science and philosophy. "Putting these notions more unambiguously in terms of concepts rather than objects, I maintain: if we hit upon some stable and effective classificatory concepts in our inquiry, we should cherish them (calling them 'natural kinds' would be one clear way of doing so), but without presuming that we have thereby found some eternal essences.

He also rejected the position taken by Bird and Tobin in our third quote above. "Alexander Bird and Emma Tobin’s succinct characterization of natural kinds is helpful here, as a foil: ‘to say that a kind is natural is to say that it corresponds to a grouping or ordering that does not depend on humans’. My view is precisely the opposite, to the extent that scientific inquiry does depend on humans."

For Chang, induction creates conditionally warranted kinds by "epistemic iteration"—refining classifications developmentally to reveal how constant conjunctions of relevant traits work: "fundamental classificatory concepts become refined and corrected through our practical scientific engagement with nature. Any considerable and lasting [instrumental] success of such engagement generates confidence in the classificatory concepts used in it, and invites us to consider them as 'natural'."

Among other examples, Chang reported the inductive iterative process by which chemists gradually redefined the kind "element". The original hypothesis was that anything that cannot be decomposed by fire or acids is an element. Learning that some chemical reactions are reversible led to the discovery of weight as a constant through reactions. And then it was discovered that some reactions involve definite and invariable weight ratios, refining understanding of constant traits. "Attempts to establish and explain the combining-weight regularities led to the development of the chemical atomic theory by John Dalton and others. ... Chemical elements were later redefined in terms of atomic number (the number of protons in the nucleus)."

Chang claimed his examples of classification practices in chemistry confirmed the fallacy of the traditional assumption that natural kinds exist as mind-independent reality. He attributed this belief more to imagining supernatural intervention in the world, than to illogical induction. He did not consider the popular belief that innate psychological capacities enable traditional induction to work. "Much natural-kind talk has been driven by an intuitive metaphysical essentialism that concerns itself with an objective [generic] order of nature whose [universal] knowledge could, ironically, only be obtained by a supernatural being. Let us renounce such an unnatural notion of natural kinds. Instead, natural kinds should be conceived as something we humans may succeed in inventing and improving through scientific practice."

Rasmus Winther's contribution to Natural Kinds and Classification in Scientific Practice gave new meaning to natural objects and qualities in the nascent discipline of Geographic Information Science (GIS). This "inter-discipline" engages in discovering patterns in—and displaying spatial kinds of—data, using methods that make its results unique natural kinds. But it still creates kinds using induction to identify instrumental traits.

"Collecting and collating geographical data, building geographical data-bases, and engaging in spatial analysis, visualization, and map-making all require organizing, typologizing, and classifying geographic space, objects, relations, and processes. I focus on the use of natural kinds ..., showing how practices of making and using kinds are contextual, fallible, plural, and purposive. The rich family of kinds involved in these activities are here baptized mapping kinds."

He later identified sub-kinds of mapping kinds as "calibrating kinds," "feature kinds," and "object kinds" of "data model types."

Winther identified "inferential processes of abstraction and generalization" as methods used by GIS, and explained how they generate digital maps. He illustrated two kinds of inquiry procedures, with sub-procedures to organize data. They are reminiscent of Dewey's multiple steps in modern inductive and deductive inference. Methods for transforming generic phenomena into kinds involve reducing complexity, amplifying, joining, and separating. Methods for selecting among generic kinds involves elimination, classification, and collapse of data. He argued that these methods for mapping kinds can be practiced in other disciplines, and briefly considered how they might harmonize three conflicting philosophical perspectives on natural kinds.

Some philosophers believe there can be a "pluralism" of kinds and classifications. They prefer to speak of "relevant" and "interesting" kinds rather than eternal "natural" kinds. They may be called social constructivists whose kinds are human products. Chang's conclusions that natural kinds are human-created and instrumentally useful would appear to put him in this group.

Other philosophers, including Quine, examine the role of kinds in scientific inference. Winther does not examine Quine's commitment to traditional induction generalizing from small samples of similar objects. But he does accept Quine's willingness to call human-identified kinds that work natural.

"Quine holds that kinds are "functionally relevant groupings in nature" whose recognition permits our inductions to "tend to come out right." That is, kinds ground fallible inductive inferences and predictions, so essential to scientific projects including those of GIS and cartography."

Finally, Winther identified a philosophical perspective seeking to reconstruct rather than reject belief in natural kinds. He placed Dewey in this group, ignoring Dewey's rejection of the traditional label in favor of "warranted assertions".

"Dewey resisted the standard view of natural kinds, inherited from the Greeks ... Instead, Dewey presents an analysis of kinds (and classes and universals) as fallible and context-specific hypotheses permitting us to address problematic situations effectively." Winther concludes that classification practices used in Geographic Information Science are able to harmonize these conflicting philosophical perspectives on natural kinds.

"GIS and cartography suggest that kinds are simultaneously discovered [as pre-existing structures] and constructed [as human classifications]. Geographic features, processes, and objects are of course real. Yet we must structure them in our data models and, subsequently, select and transform them in our maps. Realism and (social) constructivism are hence not exclusive in this field."

== See also ==
- Cognitive categorization – Organization of mental concepts
- Fact–value distinction – Distinction between what is and what ought to be
- Folk taxonomy – Vernacular, as opposed to scientific, naming system
- Inductive reasoning – Method of logical reasoning
- Instrumentalism – Position in the philosophy of science
- Instrumental and value rationality – Philosophical terms
- New riddle of induction – Philosophical paradox introduced by Nelson Goodman
- Social constructivism – Sociological theory of knowledge
