= Richard Rorty =

American philosopher (1931–2007)

- Rorty in the Wellesley College yearbook, 1959
- Born: Richard McKay Rorty; October 4, 1931; New York City, U.S.
- Died: June 8, 2007 (aged 75); Palo Alto, California, U.S.
- Father: James Rorty

Education
- Education: University of Chicago (BA, MA); Yale University (PhD)
- Doctoral advisor: Paul Weiss
- Other advisors: Rudolf Carnap; Charles Hartshorne; Richard McKeon

Philosophical work
- Era: 20th-century philosophy
- Region: Western philosophy
- School: Analytic philosophy (early); Postanalytic philosophy (late); Neopragmatism (late); Postmodernism (late); Liberalism
- Institutions: Wellesley College; Princeton University; University of Virginia; Stanford University
- Doctoral students: Robert Brandom; Michael Williams
- Main interests: Epistemology; Philosophy of language; Philosophy of mind; Ethics; Metaphilosophy; Political philosophy
- Notable ideas: Postphilosophy; Ironism; Final vocabulary; Epistemological behaviorism; Antirepresentationalism; Anti-foundationalism; Reformist left (as opposed to cultural left); Edifying philosophy (as opposed to systematic philosophy); Sentimentality as the foundation of human rights

Richard McKay Rorty (October 4, 1931 – June 8, 2007) was an American philosopher, historian of ideas, and public intellectual. Educated at the University of Chicago and Yale University, Rorty's academic career included appointments as the Stuart Professor of Philosophy at Princeton University, the Kenan Professor of Humanities at the University of Virginia, and a professor of comparative literature at Stanford University. Among his most influential books are Philosophy and the Mirror of Nature (1979), Consequences of Pragmatism (1982), and Contingency, Irony, and Solidarity (1989).

Rorty rejected the traditional idea that knowledge requires accurate mental representations of objects in the external world. He instead argued that knowledge is a linguistic and social affair grounded in how we justify our beliefs through language rather than how accurately they mirror reality. He claimed that language is made up of vocabularies that are temporary and historical, concluding that "since vocabularies are made by human beings, so are truths". The acceptance of the preceding arguments leads to what Rorty calls "ironism"; a state of mind where people are completely aware that their knowledge is dependent on their time and place in history, and are therefore somewhat detached from their own beliefs. However, Rorty also argued that "a belief can still regulate action, can still be thought worth dying for, among people who are quite aware that this belief is caused by nothing deeper than contingent historical circumstance".

== Biography ==
Richard Rorty was born on October 4, 1931, in New York City. His parents, James and Winifred Rorty, were activists, writers and social democrats. His maternal grandfather, Walter Rauschenbusch, was a central figure in the Social Gospel movement of the early 20th century.

His father experienced two nervous breakdowns in his later life. The second breakdown, which he had in the early 1960s, was more serious and "included claims to divine prescience." Consequently, Richard Rorty fell into depression as a teenager and in 1962 began a six-year psychiatric analysis for obsessional neurosis. Rorty wrote about the beauty of rural New Jersey orchids in his short autobiography, "Trotsky and the Wild Orchids," and his desire to combine aesthetic beauty and social justice. His colleague Jürgen Habermas's obituary for Rorty points out that Rorty's childhood experiences led him to a vision of philosophy as the reconciliation of "the celestial beauty of orchids with Trotsky's dream of justice on earth." Habermas described Rorty as an ironist:

Nothing is sacred to Rorty the ironist. Asked at the end of his life about the "holy", the strict atheist answered with words reminiscent of the young Hegel: "My sense of the holy is bound up with the hope that some day my remote descendants will live in a global civilization in which love is pretty much the only law."

Shortly before he turned 15, Rorty enrolled at the University of Chicago, where he received a bachelor's and a master's degree in philosophy (studying under Richard McKeon), continuing at Yale University for a PhD in philosophy (1952–1956). He married another academic, Amélie Oksenberg (Harvard University professor), with whom he had a son, Jay Rorty, in 1954. After two years in the U.S. Army, he taught at Wellesley College for three years until 1961. Rorty divorced his wife and then married Stanford University bioethicist Mary Varney in 1972. They had two children, Kevin and Patricia (now Max). While Richard Rorty was a "strict atheist" (Habermas), Mary Varney Rorty was a practicing Mormon.

Rorty was a professor of philosophy at Princeton University for 21 years. In 1981, he was a recipient of a MacArthur Fellowship, commonly known as the "Genius Grant", in its first year of awarding, and in 1982 he became Kenan Professor of the Humanities at the University of Virginia, working closely with colleagues and students in multiple departments, especially in English. In 1998 Rorty became professor of comparative literature (and philosophy, by courtesy), at Stanford University, where he spent the remainder of his academic career. During this period he was especially popular, and once quipped that he had been assigned to the position of "transitory professor of trendy studies."

Rorty's doctoral dissertation, The Concept of Potentiality, was a historical study of the concept, completed under the supervision of Paul Weiss, but his first book (as editor), The Linguistic Turn (1967), was firmly in the prevailing analytic mode, collecting classic essays on the linguistic turn in analytic philosophy. However, he gradually became acquainted with the American philosophical movement known as pragmatism, particularly the writings of John Dewey. The noteworthy work being done by analytic philosophers such as Willard Van Orman Quine and Wilfrid Sellars caused significant shifts in his thinking, which were reflected in his next book, Philosophy and the Mirror of Nature (1979).

Pragmatists generally hold that the meaning of a proposition is determined by its use in linguistic practice. Rorty combined pragmatism about truth with the later Wittgenstein's philosophy of language, which declares that meaning is a social-linguistic product, and sentences do not "link up" with the world in a correspondence relation. Rorty wrote in Contingency, Irony, and Solidarity (1989):

Truth cannot be out there—cannot exist independently of the human mind—because sentences cannot so exist, or be out there. The world is out there, but descriptions of the world are not. Only descriptions of the world can be true or false. The world on its own unaided by the describing activities of humans cannot. (p. 5)

Views like this led Rorty to question many of philosophy's most basic assumptions—and also led to his being apprehended as a postmodern/deconstructionist philosopher. Indeed, from the late 1980s through the 1990s, Rorty focused on the continental philosophical tradition, examining the works of Friedrich Nietzsche, Martin Heidegger, Michel Foucault, Jean-François Lyotard and Jacques Derrida. His work from this period includes Contingency, Irony, and Solidarity (1989), Essays on Heidegger and Others: Philosophical Papers II (1991), and Truth and Progress: Philosophical Papers III (1998). The latter two works attempt to bridge the dichotomy between analytic and continental philosophy by claiming that the two traditions complement rather than oppose each other.

According to Rorty, analytic philosophy may not have lived up to its pretensions and may not have solved the puzzles it thought it had solved. Yet such philosophy, in the process of finding reasons for putting those pretensions and puzzles aside, helped earn itself an important place in the history of ideas. By giving up on the quest for apodicticity and finality that Edmund Husserl shared with Rudolf Carnap and Bertrand Russell, and by finding new reasons for thinking that such quests will never succeed, analytic philosophy cleared a path that leads past scientism, just as the German idealists cleared a path that led around empiricism.

In the last fifteen years of his life, Rorty continued to publish his writings, including Philosophy as Cultural Politics (Philosophical Papers IV), and Achieving Our Country (1998), a political manifesto partly based on readings of Dewey and Walt Whitman in which he defended the idea of a progressive, pragmatic left against what he felt were defeatist, anti-liberal, anti-humanist positions espoused by the critical left and continental school. Rorty felt these anti-humanist positions were personified by figures like Nietzsche, Heidegger, and Foucault. Such theorists were also guilty of an "inverted Platonism" in which they attempted to craft overarching, metaphysical, "sublime" philosophies—which in fact contradicted their core claims to be ironist and contingent.

According to Eduardo Mendieta "Rorty described himself as a 'postmodern bourgeois liberal', even if he also attacked the academic left, though not for being anti-truth, but for being unpatriotic. Rorty's Zen attitude about truth could easily be confused for a form of political relativism—a Machiavellian type of politics."

Rorty's last works, after his move to Stanford University concerned the place of religion in contemporary life, liberal communities, comparative literature and philosophy as "cultural politics."

Shortly before his death, he wrote a piece called "The Fire of Life" (published in the November 2007 issue of Poetry magazine) in which he meditates on his diagnosis and the comfort of poetry. He concludes:

I now wish that I had spent somewhat more of my life with verse. This is not because I fear having missed out on truths that are incapable of statement in prose. There are no such truths; there is nothing about death that Swinburne and Landor knew but Epicurus and Heidegger failed to grasp. Rather, it is because I would have lived more fully if I had been able to rattle off more old chestnuts—just as I would have if I had made more close friends. Cultures with richer vocabularies are more fully human—farther removed from the beasts—than those with poorer ones; individual men and women are more fully human when their memories are amply stocked with verses.

On June 8, 2007, Rorty died in his home from pancreatic cancer.

== Major works ==
=== Philosophy and the Mirror of Nature ===
In Philosophy and the Mirror of Nature (1979), Rorty argues that the history of philosophy is the history of the quest to make sense of the claim that the mind has knowledge of an objective reality, and thus to give philosophy the ability to judge other aspects of culture as being in or out of touch with this reality. He dubs this idea "representationalism" and refers to it using the metaphor of the "mirror of nature", hence the title of the book.

In the introduction, Rorty claims that Ludwig Wittgenstein, Martin Heidegger, and John Dewey are the three most important philosophers of the 20th century; Wittgenstein for his diagnosis of philosophy as a set of linguistic confusions, Heidegger for his historical deconstruction of such confusions, and Dewey for his hopeful prognosis of a post-metaphysical culture. In continuing this quietist and historicist tradition, the book is therapeutic rather than constructive in nature. However, Rorty aims to carry out his therapy by using the arguments of such systematic philosophers as W. V. O. Quine, Wilfrid Sellars, Thomas Kuhn, and Donald Davidson in order to undermine our philosophical intuitions about the mind (mirror), knowledge (mirroring), and philosophy itself (the study of mirroring), and thus to undermine the representationalist picture of the "mirror of nature".

=== Contingency, Irony, and Solidarity ===
In Contingency, Irony, and Solidarity (1989), Rorty argues that there is no worthwhile theory of truth, aside from the non-epistemic semantic theory Davidson developed (based on the work of Alfred Tarski). Rorty also suggests that there are two kinds of philosophers: those occupied with private matters and those occupied with public matters. Private philosophers, who provide one with greater abilities to (re)create oneself (a view adapted from Nietzsche, and which Rorty identifies with the novels of Marcel Proust and Vladimir Nabokov), should not be expected to help with public problems. For a public philosophy, one might instead turn to philosophers like Rawls or Habermas, even though, according to Rorty, the latter is a "liberal who doesn't want to be an ironist". While Habermas believes that his theory of communicative rationality constitutes an update of rationalism, Rorty thinks that the latter and any "universal" pretensions should be totally abandoned.

This book also marks his first attempt to specifically articulate a political vision consistent with his philosophy, the vision of a diverse community bound together by opposition to cruelty, and not by abstract ideas such as "justice" or "common humanity." Consistent with his anti-foundationalism, Rorty states that there is "no noncircular theoretical backup for the belief that cruelty is horrible."

Rorty also introduces the terminology of ironism, which he uses to describe his mindset and his philosophy. Rorty describes the ironist as a person who "worries that the process of socialization which turned her into a human being by giving her a language may have given her the wrong language, and so turned her into the wrong kind of human being. But she cannot give a criterion of wrongness."

=== Objectivity, Relativism, and Truth ===
Rorty describes the project of this essay collection as trying to "offer an antirepresentationalist account of the relation between natural science and the rest of culture." Amongst the essays in Objectivity, Relativism, and Truth: Philosophical Papers, Volume 1 (1990), is "The Priority of Democracy to Philosophy," in which Rorty defends Rawls against communitarian critics. Rorty argues that liberalism can "get along without philosophical presuppositions," while at the same time conceding to communitarians that "a conception of the self that makes the community constitutive of the self does comport well with liberal democracy." Moreover, for Rorty Rawls could be compared to Habermas, a sort of United States' Habermas, with E. Mendieta's words: "An Enlightenment figure who thought that all we have is communicative reason and the use of public reason, two different names for the same thing—the use of reason by a public for the purpose of deciding how to live collectively and what aims should be the goal of the public good". For Rorty, social institutions ought to be thought of as "experiments in cooperation rather than as attempts to embody a universal and ahistorical order."

=== Essays on Heidegger and Others ===
In this text, Rorty focuses primarily on the continental philosophers Martin Heidegger and Jacques Derrida. He argues that these European "post-Nietzscheans" share much with American pragmatists, in that they critique metaphysics and reject the correspondence theory of truth. Taking up and developing what he had argued in previous works, Rorty claims that Derrida is most useful when viewed as a funny writer who attempted to circumvent the Western philosophical tradition, rather than the inventor of a philosophical (or literary) "method". In this vein, Rorty criticizes Derrida's followers like Paul de Man for taking deconstructive literary theory too seriously.

=== Achieving Our Country ===
In Achieving Our Country: Leftist Thought in Twentieth-Century America (1998), Rorty differentiates between what he sees as the two sides of the Left, a cultural Left and a progressive Left. He criticizes the cultural Left, which is exemplified by post-structuralists such as Foucault and postmodernists such as Lyotard, for offering critiques of society, but no alternatives (or alternatives that are so vague and general as to be abdications). Although these intellectuals make insightful claims about the ills of society, Rorty suggests that they provide no alternatives and even occasionally deny the possibility of progress. On the other hand, the progressive Left, exemplified for Rorty by the pragmatist John Dewey, Whitman and James Baldwin, makes hope for a better future its priority. Without hope, Rorty argues, change is spiritually inconceivable and the cultural Left has begun to breed cynicism. Rorty sees the progressive Left as acting in the philosophical spirit of pragmatism. The book's passage about of the rise of an authoritarian "strongman" who will ensure that the "smug bureaucrats, tricky lawyers, overpaid bond salesmen, and postmodernist professors will no longer be calling the shots" has been described as prophetic of Donald Trump's rise to political power.

== On human rights ==
Rorty's notion of human rights is grounded on the notion of sentimentality. He contended that throughout history humans have devised various means of construing certain groups of individuals as inhuman or subhuman. Thinking in rationalist (foundationalist) terms will not solve this problem, he claimed. Rorty advocated the creation of a culture of global human rights in order to stop violations from happening through a sentimental education. He argued that we should create a sense of empathy or teach empathy to others so as to understand others' suffering.

== On hope ==
Rorty advocates for what philosopher Nick Gall characterizes as a "boundless hope" or type of "melancholic meliorism." According to this view, Rorty replaces foundationalist hopes for certainty with those of perpetual growth and constant change, which he believes enables us to send conversation and hopes in new directions we currently can't imagine.

Rorty articulates this boundless hope in his 1982 book Consequences of Pragmatism, where he applies his framework of wholesale hope versus retail hope. Herein he says, "Let me sum up by offering a third and final characterization of pragmatism: It is the doctrine that there are no constraints on inquiry save conversational ones—no wholesale constraints derived from the nature of the objects, or of the mind, or of language, but only those retail constraints provided by the remarks of our fellow inquirers."

== Reception and criticism ==
Rorty is among the most widely discussed and controversial contemporary philosophers, and his works have provoked thoughtful responses from many other well-respected figures in the field. In Robert Brandom's anthology Rorty and His Critics, for example, Rorty's philosophy is discussed by Donald Davidson, Jürgen Habermas, Hilary Putnam, John McDowell, Jacques Bouveresse, and Daniel Dennett, among others. In 2007, Roger Scruton wrote, "Rorty was paramount among those thinkers who advance their own opinion as immune to criticism, by pretending that it is not truth but consensus that counts, while defining the consensus in terms of people like themselves." Ralph Marvin Tumaob concludes that Rorty was influenced by Jean-François Lyotard's metanarratives, and added that "postmodernism was influenced further by the works of Rorty".

McDowell is strongly influenced by Rorty, particularly Philosophy and the Mirror of Nature (1979). In continental philosophy, authors such as Jürgen Habermas, Gianni Vattimo, Jacques Derrida, Albrecht Wellmer, Hans Joas, Chantal Mouffe, Simon Critchley, Esa Saarinen, and Mike Sandbothe are influenced in different ways by Rorty's thinking. American novelist David Foster Wallace titled a short story in his collection Oblivion: Stories "Philosophy and the Mirror of Nature," and critics have identified Rorty's influence in some of Wallace's writings on irony.

Susan Haack has been a fierce critic of Rorty's neopragmatism. Haack criticises Rorty's claim to be a pragmatist at all and wrote a short play called We Pragmatists, where Rorty and Charles Sanders Peirce have a fictional conversation using only accurate quotes from their own writing. For Haack, the only link between Rorty's neopragmatism and Peirce's pragmatism is the name. Haack believes Rorty's neopragmatism is anti-philosophical and anti-intellectual, and exposes people further to rhetorical manipulation.

Although Rorty was an avowed liberal, his political and moral philosophies have been attacked by commentators from the Left, some of whom believe them to be insufficient frameworks for social justice. Rorty was also criticized for his rejection of the idea that science can depict the world. One criticism, especially of Contingency, Irony, and Solidarity, is that Rorty's philosophical hero, the ironist, is an elitist figure. Rorty argues that most people would be "commonsensically nominalist and historicist" but not ironist. They would combine an ongoing attention to the particular as opposed to the transcendent (nominalism) with an awareness of their place in a continuum of contingent lived experience alongside other individuals (historicist), without necessarily having continual doubts about the resulting worldview as the ironist does. An ironist is someone who "has radical and continuing doubts about their final vocabulary", that is "a set of words which they [humans] employ to justify their actions, their beliefs, and their lives"; "realizes that argument phrased in their vocabulary can neither underwrite nor dissolve these doubts"; and "does not think their vocabulary is closer to reality than others". On the other hand, the Italian philosopher Gianni Vattimo and the Spanish philosopher Santiago Zabala in their 2011 book Hermeneutic Communism: from Heidegger to Marx affirm that

together with Richard Rorty we also consider it a flaw that "the main thing contemporary academic Marxists inherit from Marx and Engels is the conviction that the quest for the cooperative commonwealth should be scientific rather than utopian, knowing rather than romantic." As we will show hermeneutics contains all the utopian and romantic features that Rorty refers to because, contrary to the knowledge of science, it does not claim modern universality but rather postmodern particularism.

Rorty often draws on a broad range of other philosophers to support his views, and his interpretation of their work has been contested. Since he is working from a tradition of reinterpretation, he is not interested in "accurately" portraying other thinkers, but rather in using it in the same way a literary critic might use a novel. His essay "The Historiography of Philosophy: Four Genres" is a thorough description of how he treats the greats in the history of philosophy. In Contingency, Irony, and Solidarity, Rorty attempts to disarm those who criticize his writings by arguing that their philosophical criticisms are made using axioms that are explicitly rejected within Rorty's own philosophy. For instance, he defines allegations of irrationality as affirmations of vernacular "otherness", and so—Rorty argues—accusations of irrationality can be expected during any argument and must simply be brushed aside.

== Awards and honors ==
- 1973: Guggenheim Fellowship
- 1981: MacArthur Fellowship
- 1983: Elected to the American Academy of Arts and Sciences
- 2005: Elected to the American Philosophical Society
- 2007: The Thomas Jefferson Medal, awarded by the American Philosophical Society

== Select bibliography ==
As author

- Philosophy and the Mirror of Nature. Princeton: Princeton University Press, 1979.
- Consequences of Pragmatism. Minneapolis: University of Minnesota Press, 1982. ISBN 978-0816610631
- Contingency, Irony, and Solidarity. Cambridge: Cambridge University Press, 1989. ISBN 978-0521353816
- Philosophical Papers vols. I–IV:
  - Objectivity, Relativism and Truth: Philosophical Papers I. Cambridge: Cambridge University Press, 1991. ISBN 978-0521353694
  - Essays on Heidegger and Others: Philosophical Papers II. Cambridge: Cambridge University Press, 1991.
  - Truth and Progress: Philosophical Papers III. Cambridge: Cambridge University Press, 1998.
  - Philosophy as Cultural Politics: Philosophical Papers IV. Cambridge: Cambridge University Press, 2007.
- Mind, Language, and Metaphilosophy: Early Philosophical Papers Eds. S. Leach and J. Tartaglia. Cambridge: Cambridge University Press, 2014. ISBN 978-1107612297.
- Achieving Our Country: Leftist Thought in Twentieth Century America. Cambridge, MA: Harvard University Press, 1998. ISBN 978-0674003118
- Philosophy and Social Hope. New York: Penguin, 2000.
- Against Bosses, Against Oligarchies: A Conversation with Richard Rorty. Chicago: Prickly Paradigm Press, 2002.
- The Future of Religion with Gianni Vattimo Ed. Santiago Zabala. New York: Columbia University Press, 2005. ISBN 978-0231134941
- An Ethics for Today: Finding Common Ground Between Philosophy and Religion. New York: Columbia University Press, 2005. ISBN 978-0231150569
- What's the Use of Truth? with Pascal Engel, transl. by William McCuaig, New York: Columbia University Press, 2007 ISBN 9780231140140
- On Philosophy and Philosophers: Unpublished papers 1960–2000, Ed. by W. P. Małecki and Chris Voparil, Cambridge University Press 2020 ISBN 9781108488457
- Pragmatism as Anti-Authoritarianism, Ed. E. Mendieta, foreword by Robert B. Brandom, Harvard UP 2021, ISBN 9780674248915
- What Can We Hope For? Essays on Politics, Ed. by W. P. Małecki and Chris Voparil, Princeton University Press 2022 ISBN 9780691217529

As editor

- The Linguistic Turn, Essays in Philosophical Method, (1967), edited by Richard M. Rorty, University of Chicago Press, 1992, ISBN 978-0226725697 (an introduction and two retrospective essays)
- Philosophy in History. edited by Richard M. Rorty, J. B. Schneewind, and Quentin Skinner, Cambridge: Cambridge University Press, 1985 (an essay by Richard M. Rorty, "Historiography of Philosophy", pp. 29–76)

== See also ==
- Instrumentalism
- List of American philosophers
- List of liberal theorists
- List of thinkers influenced by deconstruction
