= Irony =

Literary and rhetorical device or attitude

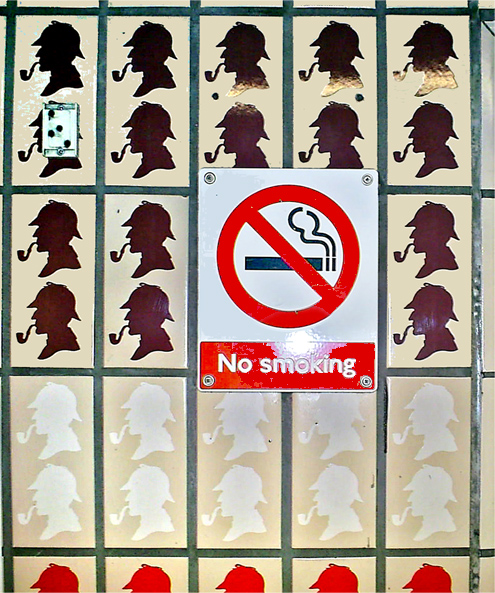
An ironic message: a "no smoking" sign has been placed over a pattern depicting a man smoking a tobacco pipe.

Irony is a juxtaposition of what, on the surface, appears to be the case with what is actually or expected to be the case. Originally a rhetorical device and literary technique, irony has also come to assume a metaphysical significance with implications for one's attitude towards life.

The concept originated in ancient Greece, where it described a dramatic character who pretended to be less intelligent than he actually was in order to outwit boastful opponents. Over time, irony evolved from denoting a form of deception to, more liberally, describing the deliberate use of language to mean the opposite of what it says for a rhetorical effect intended to be recognized by the audience.

Due to its double-sided nature, irony is a powerful tool for social bonding among those who share an understanding. For the same reason, it is also a source of division, sorting people into insiders and outsiders depending upon whether they are able to see the irony.

In the nineteenth-century, philosophers began to expand the rhetorical concept of irony into a broader philosophical conception of the human condition itself. For instance, Friedrich Schlegel saw irony as an expression of always striving toward truth and meaning without ever being able to fully grasp them. Søren Kierkegaard maintained that ironic awareness of our limitations and uncertainties is necessary to create a space for authentic human existence and ethical choice.

== Etymology ==
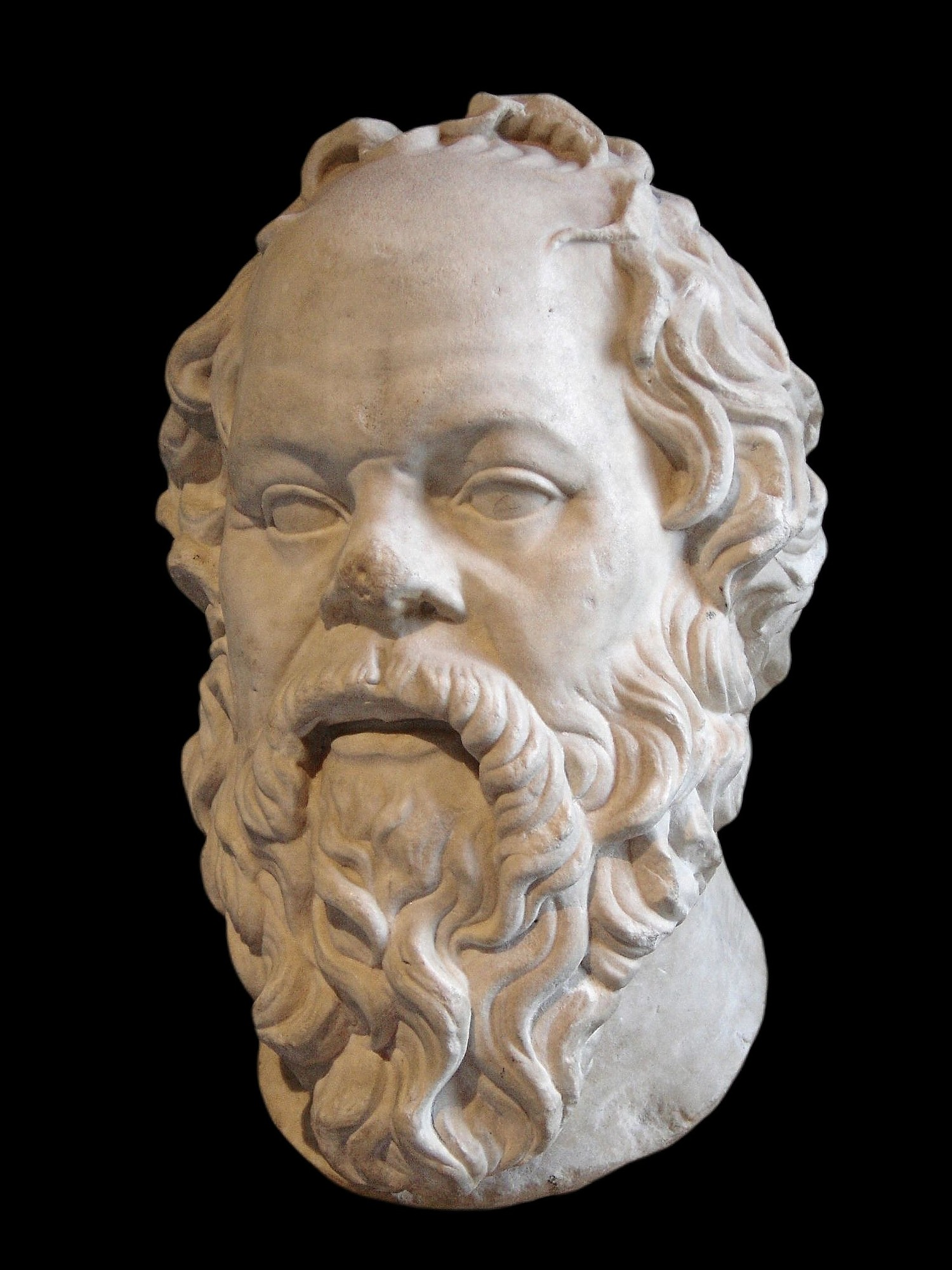
Socrates (c. 470–399 BCE) has been central to discussions of irony from his time into the present (copy of bronze head by Lysippus in the Louvre).

Irony comes from the Greek eironeia and dates back to the 5th century BCE. This term itself was coined in reference to a stock-character from Old Comedy (such as that of Aristophanes) known as the eiron, who dissimulates and affects less intelligence than he has—and so ultimately triumphs over his opposite, the alazon, a vain-glorious braggart.

Although initially synonymous with lying, in Plato's depiction of Socrates, eironeia came to acquire a new sense of "an intended simulation which the audience or hearer was meant to recognise". More simply put, it came to acquire the general definition, "the expression of one's meaning by using language that normally signifies the opposite, typically for humorous or emphatic effect".

Until the Renaissance, the Latin ironia was considered a part of rhetoric, usually a species of allegory, along the lines established by Cicero and Quintilian near the beginning of the 1st century CE. Irony entered the English language as a figure of speech in the 16th century with a meaning similar to the French ironie, itself derived from the Latin.

Around the end of the 18th century, irony takes on another sense, primarily credited to Friedrich Schlegel and other participants in what came to be known as early German Romanticism. They advance a concept of irony that is not a mere "artistic playfulness", but a "conscious form of literary creation", typically involving the "consistent alternation of affirmation and negation". No longer just a rhetorical device, on their conception, it refers to an entire metaphysical stance on the world.

== The problem of definition ==
It is commonplace to begin a study of irony with the acknowledgement that the term eludes any single definition. Philosopher Richard J. Bernstein opens his Ironic Life with the observation that a survey of the literature on irony leaves the reader with the "dominant impression" that the authors are simply "talking about different subjects". In popular culture, the 1996 song "Ironic" by Alanis Morissette is sometimes cited as evidence that the word no longer has any specific meaning.

In the 1906 The King's English, Henry Watson Fowler writes, "any definition of irony—though hundreds might be given, and very few of them would be accepted—must include this, that the surface meaning and the underlying meaning of what is said are not the same." A consequence of this, he observes, is that an analysis of irony requires the concept of a double audience "consisting of one party that hearing shall hear & shall not understand, & another party that, when more is meant than meets the ear, is aware both of that more & of the outsiders' incomprehension".

From this basic feature, literary theorist Douglas C. Muecke identifies three characteristics of verbal irony:

1. Irony depends on a double-layered or two-story phenomenon for success: "At the lower level is the situation either as it appears to the victim of irony (where there is a victim) or as it is deceptively presented by the ironist." The upper level is the situation as it appears to the reader or the ironist.
2. The ironist exploits a contradiction, incongruity, or incompatibility between the two levels.
3. Irony plays upon the innocence of a character or victim: "Either a victim is confidently unaware of the very possibility of there being an upper level or point of view that invalidates his own, or an ironist pretends not to be aware of it".

According to Wayne Booth, this uneven double-character of irony makes it a rhetorically complex phenomenon. Admired by some and feared by others, it has the power to tighten social bonds, but also to exacerbate divisions.

== Types of irony ==
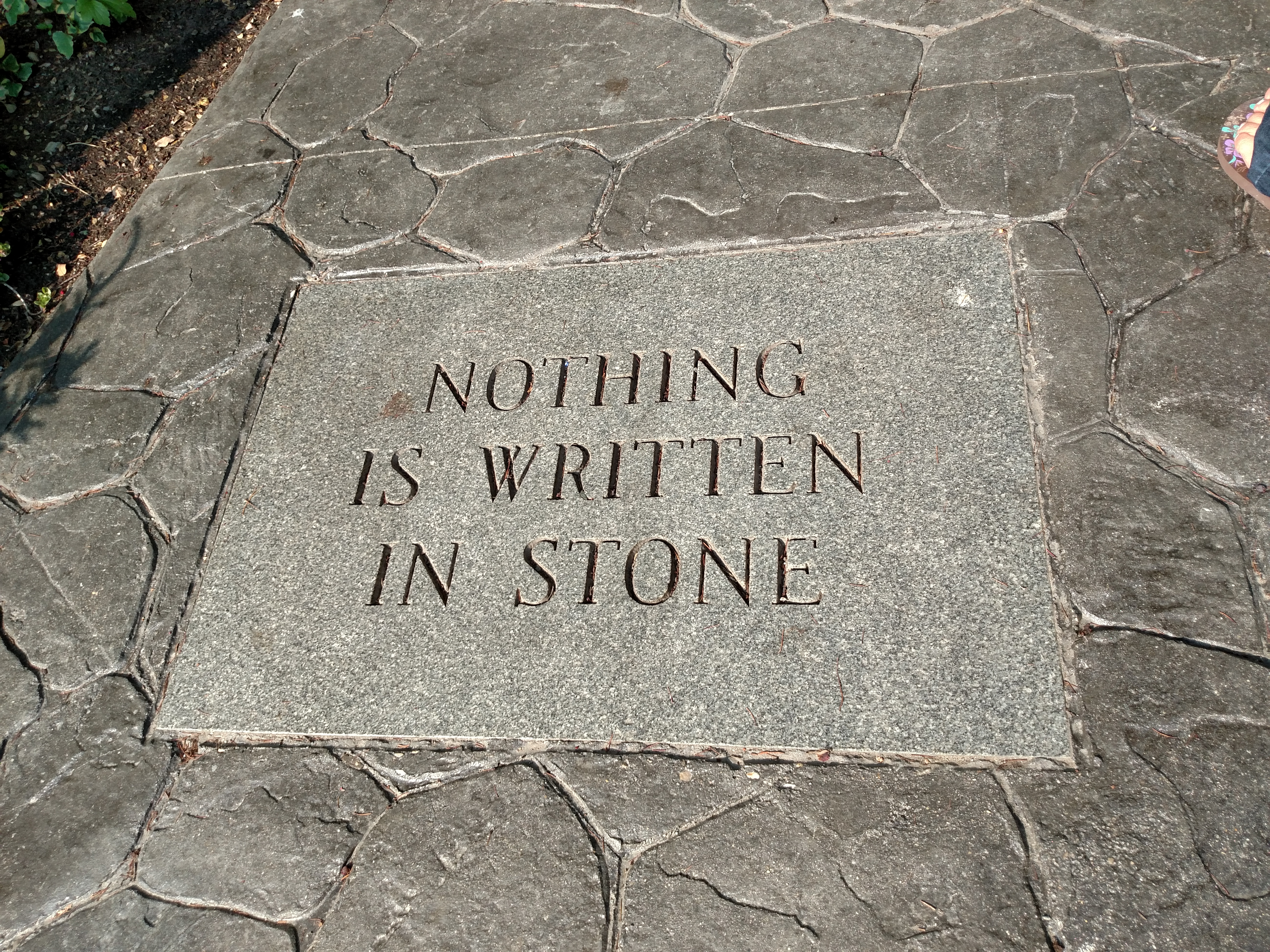
A general example of situational irony: the clause "nothing is written in stone" is, in fact, written in stone.

How best to organize irony into distinct types is almost as controversial as how best to define it. There have been many proposals, generally relying on the same cluster of types; still, there is little agreement as to how to organize the types and what if any hierarchical arrangements might exist. Nevertheless, academic reference volumes standardly include at least all four of verbal irony, dramatic irony, cosmic irony, and Romantic irony as major types. The latter three types are sometimes contrasted with verbal irony as forms of situational irony, that is, irony in which there is no ironist; so, instead of "he is being ironical" one would instead say "it is ironical that".

Verbal irony is "a statement in which the meaning that a speaker employs is sharply different from the meaning that is ostensibly expressed". Moreover, it is produced intentionally by the speaker, rather than being a literary construct, for instance, or the result of forces outside of their control. Samuel Johnson gives as an example the sentence, "Bolingbroke was a holy man" (he was anything but). Verbal irony is sometimes also considered to encompass various other literary devices such as hyperbole and its opposite, litotes, conscious naïveté, and others.

Dramatic irony provides the audience with information of which characters are unaware, thereby placing the audience in a position of advantage to recognize their words and actions as counter-productive or opposed to what their situation actually requires. Three stages may be distinguished—installation, exploitation, and resolution (often also called preparation, suspension, and resolution)—producing dramatic conflict in what one character relies or appears to rely upon, the contrary of which is known by observers (especially the audience, sometimes to other characters within the drama) to be true. Tragic irony is a specific type of dramatic irony.

Cosmic irony, sometimes also called the irony of fate, presents agents as always ultimately thwarted by forces beyond human control. It is strongly associated with the works of Thomas Hardy. This form of irony is also given metaphysical significance in the work of Søren Kierkegaard, among other philosophers.

Romantic irony is closely related to cosmic irony, and sometimes the two terms are treated interchangeably. Romantic irony is distinct, however, in that it is the author who assumes the role of the cosmic force. The narrator in Tristram Shandy is one early example. The term is closely associated with Friedrich Schlegel and the early German Romantics, and in their hands it assumed a metaphysical significance similar to cosmic irony in the hands of Kierkegaard. It was also of central importance to the literary theory advanced by New Criticism in mid-20th century.

Situational irony is a literary device and real-world occurrence where the actual outcome of an event is the exact opposite of what was reasonably expected. It subverts expectations in a stark, surprising way, going beyond mere bad luck or an unfortunate coincidence. For example, in The Wizard of Oz, Dorothy and the rest of the group are on a quest to seek out the Wizard, in the belief that he can grant their wishes, such as giving a brain to the Scarecrow. Ironically, it turns out that the Wizard is merely an ordinary man. They have always possessed the traits they have been seeking.

== Another typology ==
Building upon the double-level structure of irony, self-described "ironologist" D. C. Muecke proposes another, complementary way in which one may typify, and so better understand, ironic phenomena. What he proposes is a dual distinction between and among three grades and four modes of ironic utterance.

=== Three grades of irony ===
Grades of irony are distinguished "according to the degree to which the real meaning is concealed". Muecke names them overt, covert, and private:

- In overt irony, the true meaning is clearly apparent to both parties, and the only thing that makes the utterance ironic is the "blatancy" of the "contradiction or incongruity". Those instances of sarcasm that may be classified as ironic are overt. Muecke notes that this form of irony has a short half-life; what is obvious to everyone quickly loses its rhetorical effect with repetition.
- Covert irony is "intended not to be seen but detected". The ironist feigns ignorance to achieve the intended effect, and so there is a real danger that it simply goes by unnoticed. This means that a comparatively larger rhetorical context is in play. This may involve, for instance, assumptions about prior knowledge, the ability of someone to detect an incongruity between what is being said and the manner in which it is said, or the perspicuity of the audience in spotting an internal contradiction in the content of the message.
- Private irony is not intended to be perceived at all. It is entirely for the internal satisfaction of the ironist. Muecke cites as an example Mr. Bennet from Pride and Prejudice, who "enjoys seeing his wife or Mr Collins take his remarks at face value; that is to say, he enjoys the irony of their being impervious to irony".

=== Four modes of irony ===
Muecke's typology distinguishes modes "according to the kind of relationship between the ironist and the irony". He calls these impersonal irony, self-disparaging irony, ingénue irony, and dramatized irony:

- Impersonal irony is distinguished by deadpan blankness of the ironist, a sort of affected graveness or poker-face. It is associated with 'dry humor' quite generally, but also encompasses more specific ironic postures such as 'pretend agreement with the ironic victim', 'false ignorance', 'understatement', 'overstatement', and many other familiar forms of ironic utterance.
- Self-disparaging irony is distinguished by the introduction of the personality of the ironist, often with a somewhat performative dimension. This, however, is intended to be transparent, and is done in the service of directing irony against another object. For instance, when Socrates laments his misfortune of having a poor memory, the object of his irony is the overly long speech made by the fictionalized Protagoras in Plato's dialogue; his memory, the reader is to understand, is perfectly fine.
- Ingénue irony is distinguished by an assumed ignorance that is intended to be convincing. The canonical example is The Emperor's New Clothes. Another example is the Fool in King Lear. Muecke writes, "the effectiveness of this kind of irony comes from its economy of means: mere common sense or even simple innocence or ignorance may suffice" to break through the targeted hypocrisy or foolishness of received ideas.
- Dramatized irony is the simple presentation of ironic situations for the enjoyment of an audience. The ironist remains out of sight. The novels of Gustave Flaubert are among the many literary examples of this technique. Muecke notes an increase in this type of irony beginning in the latter half of the eighteenth century when, he says, "irony began to be attended to for its intrinsic interest and delight".

In any of these four modes, irony may be used to emphasize a point, to satirically undermine a position, or to heuristically lead one's audience to a deeper understanding.

== The rhetorical dimension ==
To consider irony from a rhetorical perspective means to consider it as an act of communication. In A Rhetoric of Irony, Wayne C. Booth seeks to answer the question of "how we manage to share ironies and why we so often do not".

Because irony involves expressing something in a way contrary to literal meaning, it always involves a kind of "translation" on the part of the audience. Booth identifies three principal kinds of agreement upon which the successful translation of irony depends: common mastery of language, shared cultural values, and (for artistic ironies) a common experience of genre.

A consequence of this element of in-group membership is that there is more at stake in whether one grasps an ironic utterance than there is in whether one grasps an utterance presented straight. As he puts it, the use of irony is

An aggressively intellectual exercise that fuses fact and value, requiring us to construct alternative hierarchies and choose among them; [it] demands that we look down on other men's follies or sins; floods us with emotion-charged value judgments which claim to be backed by the mind; accuses other men not only of wrong beliefs but of being wrong at their very foundations and blind to what these foundations imply[.]

This is why, when we misunderstand an intended ironic utterance, we often feel more embarrassed about our failure to recognize the incongruity than we typically do when we simply misunderstand a statement of fact. When one's deepest beliefs are at issue, so too, often, is one's pride. Nevertheless, even as it excludes its victims, irony also has the power to build and strengthen the community of those who do understand and appreciate.

=== Relation to sarcasm ===
Humor psychologist Rod A. Martin distinguishes the basic definition of irony ("the literal meaning is opposite to the intended") from sarcasm, which is an "aggressive humor that pokes fun". Similarly, psychology researchers Christopher J. Lee and Albert N. Katz find that ridicule is an important aspect of sarcasm, but not of verbal irony in general.

This narrower connotation of disparagement associated with sarcasm is further supported by its etymology: where eiron refers to a dissembler, the verb sarkazein means "to tear flesh [like a dog]".

In spite of these differences, linguist Geoffrey Nunberg observes sarcasm replacing the "linguistic terrain" formerly held by verbal irony as early as 2000. In everyday usage, the term irony is sometimes more narrowly reserved for situational irony.

== General irony, or "irony as a way of life" ==
Typically irony is used, as described above, with respect to some specific act or situation. In more philosophical contexts, however, the term is sometimes assigned a more general significance, in which it is used to describe an entire way of life or a universal truth about the human situation. Even Booth, whose interest is expressly rhetorical, notes that the word "irony" tends to attach to "a type of character — Aristophanes' foxy eirons, Plato's disconcerting Socrates — rather than to any one device". In these contexts, what is often treated as just a rhetorical phenomenon is ascribed existential or metaphysical significance. As Muecke puts it, such irony is that of "life itself or any general aspect of life seen as fundamentally and inescapably an ironic state of affairs. No longer is it a case of isolated victims .... we are all victims of impossible situations".

This usage has its origins primarily in the work of Friedrich Schlegel and other early 19th-century German Romantics and in Søren Kierkegaard's analysis of Socrates in The Concept of Irony.

=== Friedrich Schlegel ===
Friedrich Schlegel was at the forefront of the intellectual movement that has come to be known as Frühromantik, or early German Romanticism, situated narrowly between 1797 and 1801. For Schlegel, the "romantic imperative" (a rejoinder to Immanuel Kant's "categorical imperative") is to break down the distinction between art and life with the creation of a "new mythology" for the modern age. In particular, Schlegel was responding to what he took to be the failure of the foundationalist enterprise, exemplified for him by the philosophy of Johann Gottlieb Fichte.

Irony is a response to the apparent epistemic uncertainties of anti-foundationalism. In the words of scholar Frederick C. Beiser, Schlegel presents irony as consisting in "the recognition that, even though we cannot attain truth, we still must forever strive toward it, because only then do we approach it." His model is Socrates, who "knew that he knew nothing", yet never ceased in his pursuit of truth and virtue. According to Schlegel, instead of resting upon a single foundation, "the individual parts of a successful synthesis formation support and negate each other reciprocally".

Although Schlegel frequently does describe the Romantic project with a literary vocabulary, his use of the term "poetry" (Poesie) is non-standard. Instead, he goes back to the broader sense of the original Greek poiētikós, which refers to any kind of making. As Beiser puts it, "Schlegel intentionally explodes the narrow literary meaning of Poesie by explicitly identifying the poetic with the creative power in human beings, and indeed with the productive principle in nature itself." Poetry in the restricted literary sense is its highest form, but in no way its only form.

According to Schlegel, irony captures the human situation of always striving towards, but never completely possessing, what is infinite or true.

==== G. W. F. Hegel's interpretation ====
This presentation of Schlegel's account of irony is at odds with many 20th-century interpretations, which, neglecting the larger historical context, have been predominantly postmodern. These readings overstate the irrational dimension of early Romantic thought at the expense of its rational commitments—precisely the dilemma irony is introduced to resolve.

Already in Schlegel's own day, G. W. F. Hegel was unfavorably contrasting Romantic irony with that of Socrates. On Hegel's reading, Socratic irony partially anticipates his own dialectical approach to philosophy. Romantic irony, by contrast, Hegel alleges to be fundamentally trivializing and opposed to all seriousness about what is of substantial interest. According to Rüdiger Bubner, however, Hegel's "misunderstanding" of Schlegel's concept of irony is "total" in its denunciation of a figure actually intended to preserve "our openness to a systematic philosophy".

Yet, it is Hegel's interpretation that would be taken up and amplified by Kierkegaard, who further extends the critique to Socrates himself.

=== Søren Kierkegaard ===
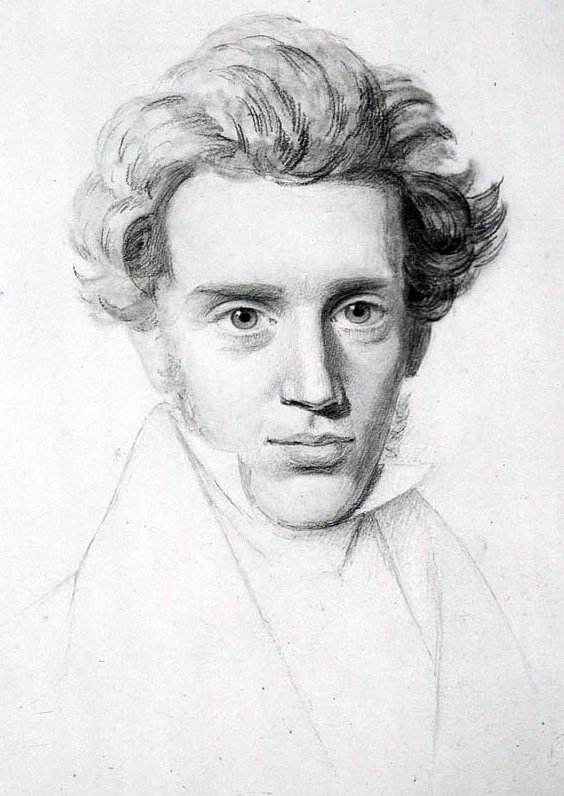
Unfinished Sketch of Søren Kierkegaard by Niels Christian Kierkegaard, Royal Library, Denmark, c. 1840

Thesis VIII of the Danish philosopher Søren Kierkegaard's dissertation, The Concept of Irony with Continual Reference to Socrates, states that "irony as infinite and absolute negativity is the lightest and the weakest form of subjectivity". Although this terminology is Hegelian in origin, Kierkegaard employs it with a somewhat different meaning. Richard J. Bernstein elaborates:

It is infinite because it is directed not against this or that particular existing entity, but against the entire given actuality at a certain time. It is thoroughly negative because it is incapable of offering any positive alternative. Nothing positive emerges out of this negativity. And it is absolute because Socrates refuses to cheat.

In this way, contrary to traditional accounts, Kierkegaard portrays Socrates as genuinely ignorant. According to Kierkegaard, Socrates is the embodiment of an ironic negativity that dismantles others' illusory knowledge without offering any positive replacement.

Almost all of Kierkegaard's post-dissertation publications were written under a variety of pseudonyms. Scholar K. Brian Söderquist argues that these fictive authors should be viewed as explorations of the existential challenges posed by such an ironic, poetic self-consciousness. Their awareness of their own unlimited powers of self-interpretation prevents them from fully committing to any single self-narrative, and this leaves them trapped in an entirely negative mode of uncertainty.

Nevertheless, seemingly against this, Thesis XV of the dissertation states that "Just as philosophy begins with doubt, so also a life that may be called human begins with irony". Bernstein writes that the emphasis here must be on begins. Irony is not itself an authentic mode of life, but it is a precondition for attaining such a life. Although pure irony is self-destructive, it generates a space in which it becomes possible to reengage with the world in a genuine mode of ethical passion. For Kierkegaard himself, this took the form of religious inwardness. What is crucial, however, is just to in some way move beyond the purely (or merely) ironic. Irony is what creates the space in which one can learn and meaningfully choose how to live a life worthy (vita digna) of being called human.

== Postmodernism ==
Postmodern irony rejects the possibility of an authoritative viewpoint such as could discern true meaning behind contradictory appearances. Instead, it operates within a framework where all positions are understood as contextual and contingent. This, however, produces a contradiction: the postmodern theorist who declares the end of all master-narratives, just by making such a declaration, claims an authoritative stance. Rather than resolving this contradiction, postmodern irony embraces it as fundamental to the human condition of speech and meaning-making, in which every act of communication adopts a position necessarily of a limited and constructed nature.

For instance, the neopragmatist philosopher Richard Rorty advances a concept of irony centered on the "liberal ironist", whom he contrasts with "the metaphysician". The ironist, according to this theory, is someone who maintains radical doubts about their own "final vocabulary" (the fundamental concepts used to justify their beliefs and actions), recognizes that rational argument cannot resolve these doubts, and doesn't believe their vocabulary is closer to ultimate reality than others. This postmodern position is a consequence of acknowledging the historical contingency and plurality of vocabularies, where no neutral standards exist for choosing definitively between different ways of describing the world. On this theory, irony functions as both a philosophical method and way of life that disrupts entrenched vocabularies through redescription, metaphor, and narrative rather than traditional argument.

== See also ==
- Accismus
- Apophasis
- Auto-antonym
- Hypocrisy
- Ironism
- Irony punctuation
- Meta-communication
- Oxymoron
- Paradox
- Post-irony

== Bibliography ==
- Abrams, M. H.; Harpham, Geoffrey (2008). A Glossary of Literary Terms. Cengage Learning. ISBN 978-1413033908.
- Beiser, Frederick C. (2006). The Romantic Imperative: The Concept of Early German Romanticism. Harvard University Press. ISBN 978-0674019805.
- Bernstein, Richard J. (2016). Ironic Life. Polity Press. ISBN 978-1509505722.
- Booth, Wayne C. (1974). A Rhetoric of Irony. University of Chicago Press. ISBN 978-0226065533.
- Bubner, Rudiger (2003). The Innovations of Idealism. Cambridge University Press. ISBN 978-0521662628.
- Colebrook, Claire (2004). Irony. Psychology Press. ISBN 978-0415251334.
- Cuddon, J. A. (2013). A Dictionary of Literary Terms and Literary Theory. John Wiley & Sons. ISBN 9781444333275.
- Fowler, Henry Watson (1994). A Dictionary of Modern English Usage. Wordsworth Editions. ISBN 1-85326-318-4.
- Frank, Manfred (2004). The Philosophical Foundations of Early German Romanticism. SUNY Press. ISBN 978-0791459485.
- Frye, Northrop (1990). Anatomy of criticism: 4 essays. Princeton University Press. ISBN 978-0691012988.
- Hirsch, Edward (2014). A Poet's Glossary. Houghton Mifflin. ISBN 978-0151011957.
- Inwood, Michael (1992). A Hegel Dictionary. Wiley. ISBN 978-0631175339.
- Johnson, Samuel (2021). "I'rony n.s." A Dictionary of the English Language (1755, 1773).
- Kierkegaard, Søren (1989). The Concept of Irony With Continual Reference to Socrates. Translated by Howard V. Hong and Edna H. Hong. Princeton University Press. ISBN 978-0691020723.
- Kreuz, Roger (2020). Irony and Sarcasm (eBook ed.). MIT Press. ISBN 978-0262538268.
- Lee, Christopher J.; Katz, Albert N. (1998). "The Differential Role of Ridicule in Sarcasm and Irony". Metaphor and Symbol. 13: 1–15. doi:10.1207/s15327868ms1301_1.
- Martin, Rod A.; Ford, Thomas (2018). The Psychology of Humor: An Integrative Approach (2nd ed.). Academic Press.
- Muecke, D. C. (2023). The Compass of Irony. Taylor & Francis Limited. ISBN 978-0367655259.
- OED staff (2016). "Irony, n." Oxford English Dictionary (3rd ed.). Oxford University Press.
- Peterson, Britt (2015). "Learning to love Alanis Morissette's 'irony' – The Boston Globe". bostonglobe.com. Archived from the original on 25 November 2016.
- Preminger, Alex; Brogan, Terry V. F. (1993). The New Princeton Encyclopedia of Poetry and Poetics. MJF Books. ISBN 978-1567311525.
- Ramberg, Bjørn; Dieleman, Susan (2024). "Richard Rorty". In Edward N. Zalta & Uri Nodelman (ed.). The Stanford Encyclopedia of Philosophy (Winter 2024 Edition). Metaphysics Research Lab, Stanford University.
- Rush, Fred (2016). Irony and Idealism: Rereading Schlegel, Hegel and Kierkegaard. Oxford University Press. ISBN 978-0199688227.
- Söderquist, K. Brian (2013). "Irony". In Lippitt, John; Pattison, George (eds.). The Oxford Handbook of Kierkegaard. OUP Oxford. pp. 344–64. ISBN 978-0199601301.
- Stanton, R (1956). "Dramatic Irony in Hawthorne's Romances". Modern Language Notes. 71 (6). Johns Hopkins University Press: 420–26. doi:10.2307/3043161. JSTOR 3043161.
