= Ironism =

Postmodernist philosophical concept

Ironism (from irony) is a theoretical and literary stance introduced by the American neopragmatist Richard Rorty in his 1989 book Contingency, Irony, and Solidarity. The concept expresses a form of self-understanding grounded in the recognition that one’s most fundamental vocabulary, sense of self, and sense of community are contingent rather than derived from objective or universal foundations.

Rorty contrasts ironism with metaphysical realism, arguing that the latter seeks immutable truths about reality, whereas the ironist accepts that all descriptions of the world are historically situated and revisable. Ironism is thus central to Rorty’s vision of a post-metaphysical culture in which individuals are free to continually redescribe themselves and their communities without appeal to transcendental justification.

== Overview ==
In Contingency, Irony, and Solidarity, Rorty presents ironism as typical of modern intellectual life, particularly within liberal democratic societies. Ironism entails a sustained awareness of the contingency of language, the contingency of selfhood, and the contingency of community. These three themes correspond to the book’s opening chapters, in which Rorty argues that vocabularies evolve through metaphorical redescription rather than discovery of intrinsic essences.

For Rorty, an ironist recognizes that the terms through which she understands herself and others—her “final vocabulary”—are products of time, culture, and circumstance, not mirrors of nature. Yet this recognition does not lead to paralysis or relativism; it encourages imaginative flexibility and the capacity to redescribe the world in new and fruitful ways.

== Ironist ==
Rorty offers an explicit three-part definition of the ironist:

I shall define an "ironist" as someone who fulfills three conditions: (1) She has radical and continuing doubts about the final vocabulary she currently uses, because she has been impressed by other vocabularies, vocabularies taken as final by people or books she has encountered; (2) she realizes that argument phrased in her present vocabulary can neither underwrite nor dissolve these doubts; (3) insofar as she philosophizes about her situation, she does not think that her vocabulary is closer to reality than others, that it is in touch with a power not herself.

The ironist is therefore a person who lives without metaphysical comfort, accepting that justification is always internal to a vocabulary. Rorty identifies figures such as Kierkegaard, Nietzsche, Baudelaire, Proust, Heidegger, and Nabokov as exemplars of the ironist sensibility.

== Ironism ==
Ironism names the attitude, stance, or ethos characteristic of ironists. It is a kind of intellectual self-irony: a continual awareness that one’s deepest commitments are contingent, coupled with a refusal to treat them as more “real” or “rational” than those of others. Rorty does not explicitly define or describe ironism as he does for the ironist. However, one can derive a description of ironism—as the stance of an ironist—from one of his descriptions of the ironist:

[Ironism is the stance of facing] up to the contingency of [one's] own most central beliefs and desires—[a stance] sufficiently historicist and nominalist to have abandoned the idea that [one's] central beliefs and desires refer back to something beyond the reach of time and chance.

== Ironist Theory ==
Rorty also introduces the term ironist theory to describe a particular kind of theoretical writing that contrasts with philosophical writing.

According to Rorty:

The goal of ironist theory is to understand the metaphysical urge, the urge to theorize, so well that one becomes entirely free of it. Ironist theory is thus a ladder to be thrown away as soon as one has figured out what drove one's predecessors to theorize. The last thing the ironist theorist wants or needs, is a theory of ironism. He is not in the business of supplying himself and his fellow ironists with a method, a platform, or a rationale. He is just doing the same thing that all ironists do—attempting autonomy. He is trying to get out from under inherited contingencies and make his own contingencies, get out from under an old final vocabulary and fashion one which will be all his own.

He classifies the works of (young) Hegel, Nietzsche, Heidegger, and Derrida as forms of ironist theory because they aim not to explain the world but to make readers aware of the contingency of their own vocabularies. Ironist theory thus has no constructive or foundational program; its purpose is therapeutic, loosening the hold of necessity and encouraging creative self-recreation. The point of ironist theory, especially that of Rorty's theorizing itself, is not to establish a philosophy of ironism; it is only to inspire readers to become ironists by embracing the stance of ironism and thereby ceasing to philosophize in the traditional sense.

== Philosophical context ==
Rorty introduces ironism within the broader framework of his “New Pragmatism” or “neopragmatism,” perspectives that reject the “Platonist tradition” and what he regarded as philosophy’s commitment to “representationalism.” As the Internet Encyclopedia of Philosophy explains, Rorty believed that both Platonism and analytic philosophy were shaped by this “fatal flaw.” Influenced by Darwin, Hegel, Heidegger, and Dewey, he developed a historicist and anti-essentialist point of view that found early expression in Philosophy and the Mirror of Nature (1979). There, he abandoned the idea that the mind possesses privileged access to reality and instead treated “language” as “an adaptive tool used to cope with the natural and social environments to achieve a desired, pragmatic end.”

The Stanford Encyclopedia of Philosophy describes Rorty’s work as combining a “critical diagnosis” of the “defining projects of modern philosophy” with a “positive” effort to imagine intellectual culture beyond those projects. In particular, Rorty criticizes the conception of “knowledge as representation,” understood as a “mental mirroring of a mind-external world.” He proposed instead that knowledge be understood “as a matter of conversation and of social practice, rather than as an attempt to mirror nature.” This stance provides the philosophical background for ironism.

In Contingency, Irony, and Solidarity (1989), Rorty argues that “there is nothing beyond vocabularies which serves as a criterion of choice between them.” The ironist encounters “different and compelling descriptions” and recognizes the contingency of her own “final vocabulary.” Related themes appear in Objectivity, Relativism, and Truth (1991), where Rorty maintains that “whatever good the ideas of ‘objectivity’ and ‘transcendence’ have done for our culture can be attained equally well by the idea of a community,” and that “no description of how things are from a God’s-eye point of view… is going to free us from the contingency of having been acculturated as we were.” Ironism reflects Rorty’s broader anti-foundationalist and historicist commitments.

== Influence and Criticism ==
Rorty has acknowledged that ironism has come across as a kind of sneering attitude:

Q: And what would you say to criticisms that your ironism amounts to a sneering at earnest liberals who don’t want to acknowledge the contingency of their own values? Rorty: That was certainly the way it came across. But what I wanted to say was: take yourself with some lightness. Be aware of yourself as being at the mercy of the contingencies of your upbringing, your culture, and your environment. I thought of it myself as offering advice rather than insults. My liberal ironist doesn’t go around being ironic to everybody she meets. She saves the irony for herself. The liberal part is public, and the ironic part is private.

Despite such reaction, Rorty's philosophical influence, including his concepts of the ironist, ironism, and ironic theory continues to be discussed and debated.
