= Philosophy and Social Hope =

1999 book written by Richard Rorty

- Author: Richard Rorty
- Language: English
- Subjects: Political philosophy, culture, literary criticism
- Publisher: Penguin Group
- Publication date: 1999
- Publication place: United States
- Media type: Print (Hardback & Paperback)
- Pages: 288
- ISBN: 978-0-14-026288-9
- OCLC: 41311603
- Dewey Decimal: 191 21
- LC Class: B945.R521 R67 1999

Philosophy and Social Hope is a 1999 book written by philosopher Richard Rorty and published by Penguin. The book is a collection of cultural and political essays intended to reach a wider audience and, like his previous books, it presents Rorty's own version of pragmatism. 'Trotsky and the Wild Orchids' is the most autobiographical piece and explains how he moved from Plato's philosophical framework towards Ludwig Wittgenstein's and John Dewey's anti-essentialism.
