= Contingency, Irony, and Solidarity =

1989 book by Richard Rorty

- Cover of the first edition
- Author: Richard Rorty
- Language: English
- Subject: Philosophy, literary criticism
- Publisher: Cambridge University Press
- Publication date: 1989
- Publication place: United States
- Media type: Print (hardcover · paperback)
- Pages: 201
- ISBN: 978-0-521-35381-6
- Dewey Decimal: 401 19
- LC Class: P106 .R586 1989

Contingency, Irony, and Solidarity is a 1989 book by the American philosopher Richard Rorty, based on two sets of lectures he gave at University College, London, and at Trinity College, Cambridge. In contrast to his earlier work, Philosophy and the Mirror of Nature (1979), Rorty mostly abandons attempts to explain his theories in analytical terms and instead creates an alternate vocabulary to that of the "Platonists" he rejects. In this vocabulary, "truth" (as the term is used conventionally) is considered unintelligible and meaningless.

The book is divided into three parts: "Contingency", "Ironism and Theory", and "Cruelty and Solidarity".

== Part I: Contingency ==
=== 1) The contingency of language ===
Here, Rorty argues that all language is contingent. This is because "only descriptions of the world can be true or false", and descriptions are made by humans who must also make truth or falsity: truth or falsity is thus not determined by any intrinsic property of the world being described. Instead, they purely belong to the human realm of description and language. For example, a factual case of green grass is neither true nor false, in and by itself, but that grass is green may be true. One could say that grass is green and another person could agree with the statement (which for Rorty makes the statement true), but the use of the words to describe grass is distinct and independent of the grass itself.

Apart from human expression in language, notions of truth or falsity are simply irrelevant, or maybe inexistent or nonsensical. Rorty consequently argues that all discussion of language in relation to reality should be abandoned and that one should instead discuss vocabularies in relation to other vocabularies. In coherence with this view, he thus states that he will not exactly be making "arguments" in this book, because arguments, as expression mostly within the domain of a given vocabulary, preclude novelty.

=== 2) The contingency of selfhood ===
Rorty proposes that each of us has a set of beliefs whose contingency we more or less ignore, which he dubs our "final vocabulary". One of the strong poet's greatest fears, according to Rorty, is that he will discover that he has been operating within someone else's final vocabulary all along; that he has not "self-created". It is his goal, therefore, to recontextualize the past that led to his historically contingent self, so that the past that defines him will be created by him, rather than creating him.

=== 3) The contingency of a liberal community ===
Rorty begins this chapter by addressing critics who accuse him of irrationality and moral relativism. He asserts that accusations of irrationality are merely affirmations of vernacular "otherness". We use the term "irrational" when we come across a vocabulary that cannot be synthesized with our own, as when a father calls his son irrational for being scared of the dark, or when a son calls his father irrational for not checking under the bed for monsters. The vocabulary of "real monsters" is not shared between father and son, and so accusations of irrationality fly. As for moral relativism, for Rorty, this accusation can only be considered a criticism if one believes in a metaphysically salient and salutary moral, which Rorty firmly does not.

Rorty then discusses his liberal utopia. He gives no argument for liberalism and believes that there have been and will be many ironists who are not liberal, but he does propose that we as members of a democratic society are becoming more and more liberal. In his utopia, people would never discuss restrictive metaphysical generalities such as good, "moral", or "human nature", but would be allowed to communicate freely with each other on entirely subjective terms.

Rorty sees most cruelty as stemming from metaphysical questions like, "what is it to be human?", because questions such as these allow us to rationalize that some people are to be considered less than human, thus justifying cruelty to those people. In other words, we can only call someone "less than human" if we have a metaphysical "yardstick" with which to measure their prototypical human-ness. If we deprive ourselves of this yardstick (by depriving ourselves of metaphysics altogether), we have no means with which to dehumanize anyone.

== Part II: Ironism and Theory ==
=== 4) Private irony and liberal hope ===
Rorty introduces a term that he believes effectively describes the status of a person holding the "axioms" set out in the first three chapters. This person is an ironist. An "ironist", according to Rorty, is someone who fulfils three conditions:

(1) She has radical and continuing doubts about the final vocabulary she currently uses because she has been impressed by other vocabularies, vocabularies taken as final by people or books she has encountered; (2) she realizes that arguments phrased in her present vocabulary can neither underwrite nor dissolve these doubts; (3) insofar as she philosophizes about her situation, she does not think that her vocabulary is closer to reality than others, that it is in touch with a power, not herself.

=== 5) Self-creation and affiliation: Proust, Nietzsche, and Heidegger ===
Rorty views Proust, Nietzsche, and Heidegger each as different types of ironists. In Remembrance of Things Past, Proust almost perfectly exemplifies ironism by constantly recontextualizing and redefining the characters he meets along the way, thus preventing any particular final vocabulary from becoming especially salient. Nietzsche is an ironist because he believes all truths to be contingent, but he tends to slip back into metaphysics, especially when discussing his superman. Heidegger is an ironist because he has mostly rejected metaphysics and its conception of language as a means to an end, but his discussion of elementary words forces him to propose a "universal litany" (or "universal poem"), that does not exist, because every great ironic "poet-thinker" (such as Nietzsche, Proust and Heidegger) has a very particular, subjective and contingent one.

=== 6) From ironist theory to private allusions: Derrida ===
For Rorty, Derrida most perfectly typifies the ironist. In his The Post Card: From Socrates to Freud and Beyond, especially, Derrida free-associates about "theorizers" instead of theories, thus preventing him from discussing metaphysics at all. This keeps Derrida contingent, and maintains Derrida's ability to recreate his past so that his past does not create him. Derrida is, therefore, autonomous and self-creating, two properties which Rorty considers most valuable to a private ironist. While Derrida does not discuss philosophies per se, he responds, reacts, and is primarily concerned with philosophy. Because he is contained in this philosophical tradition, he is still a philosopher, even if he does not philosophize.

== Part III: Cruelty and Solidarity ==
=== 7) The barber of Kasbeam: Nabokov on cruelty ===
Rorty furthers his distinction between public and private by classifying books into those "which help us become autonomous" and those "which help us become less cruel", and roughly dividing the latter group into "books which help us see the effects of social practices and institutions on others" and "those which help us see the effects of our private idiosyncrasies on others." He dismisses the moral-aesthetic contrast, instead proposing the separation of books which offer relaxation from books which supply novel stimuli to action. Metaphysicians, having little doubt about their final vocabularies, confuse private projects with the pleasure of relaxation, and hence dismiss, as not serious or merely aesthetic, not only those writers with no relevance to liberal hope, like Nietzsche and Derrida, but also those warning against the potential for cruelty inherent in the quest for autonomy, among which Rorty places Nabokov and Orwell, since "both of them dramatize the tension between private irony and liberal hope."

Nabokov's dismissal of "topical trash or what some call the Literature of Ideas" and Orwell's rejection of art for art's sake are criticized as attempts to excommunicate writings different from their own while perpetuating the moral-aesthetic contrast. Rorty brings together their contrasting claims about art by saying that there is no such thing as "the writer" or "the nature of literature" (we can instead ask, "What purposes does this book serve?"), and that the pursuit of private perfection, as well as serving human liberty, are both perfectly reasonable aims for writers with different gifts. He wants to stress their similarities, seeing them both as political liberals (like Proust and Derrida, unlike Nietzsche and Heidegger), and as having tried to get us inside cruelty, which in Orwell's case refers to the end of 1984, differing from his usual "topical trash", i.e., descriptions of cruelty from the outside.

Nabokov is described as horrified by the possibility of having been cruel, particularly as a consequence of a lack of curiosity about others. In a rare attempt at general ideas, he equates art, or "aesthetic bliss", with "curiosity, tenderness, kindness and ecstasy," hence apparently resolving the dilemma of the liberal aesthete by offering the curious artist, or non-obsessed poet, as the paradigm of morality. Rorty argues that Nabokov's most important creations, Humbert Humbert and Charles Kinbote, originate from his knowledge that actually "there is no synthesis of ecstasy and kindness" and they also tend to be mutually exclusive. As opposed to the non-obsessed and second-rate poet John Shade, they are as artistically gifted as Nabokov, selectively curious and cruel. "This particular sort of genius-monster - the monster of incuriosity - is Nabokov's contribution to our knowledge of human possibilities."

The title of the chapter refers to a crucial part of Lolita, Humbert's reminiscence about his late realisation that the son the barber was telling him about was actually dead, which Rorty sees as a pointer to the nature of Humbert's relation to Lolita. Likewise, there are the few subtle hints to the importance of Lolita's brother's death, that the reader is expected to connect, as opposed to Humbert, and that end up being stressed by the author in the Afterword.

Rorty ends the chapter with:

He knew as well as John Shade did that all one can do with such gifts is sort out one's relations to this world ...,. the world in which ugly and ungifted children like Shade's daughter and the boy Jo are humiliated and die. Nabokov's best novels are the ones which exhibit his inability to believe his own general ideas.

=== 8) The last intellectual in Europe: Orwell on cruelty ===
George Orwell, especially in Nineteen Eighty-Four and Animal Farm, represents public, or institutional, cruelty. Rorty argues that Orwell deprived the liberal community of their hopes for liberal utopia without providing them with an alternative. For Rorty, Orwell represents a liberal who is not an ironist, while Heidegger represents an ironist who is not a liberal.

=== 9) Solidarity ===
In this chapter, Rorty argues that because humans tend to view morals as "we-statements" (e.g., "We Christians do not commit murder"), they find it easier to be cruel to those whom they can define as "them" (meaning, as "we"). He therefore urges that they continue to expand their definition of "we" to include more and more subsets of the human population until no one can be considered less-than-human.

== Reviews ==
The book was reviewed by Jenny Teichman in The New York Times as well as by Bernard Williams for The London Review of Books.

It was also reviewed by Alasdair MacIntyre in The Journal of Philosophy.
