= Pragmatism =

Philosophical tradition

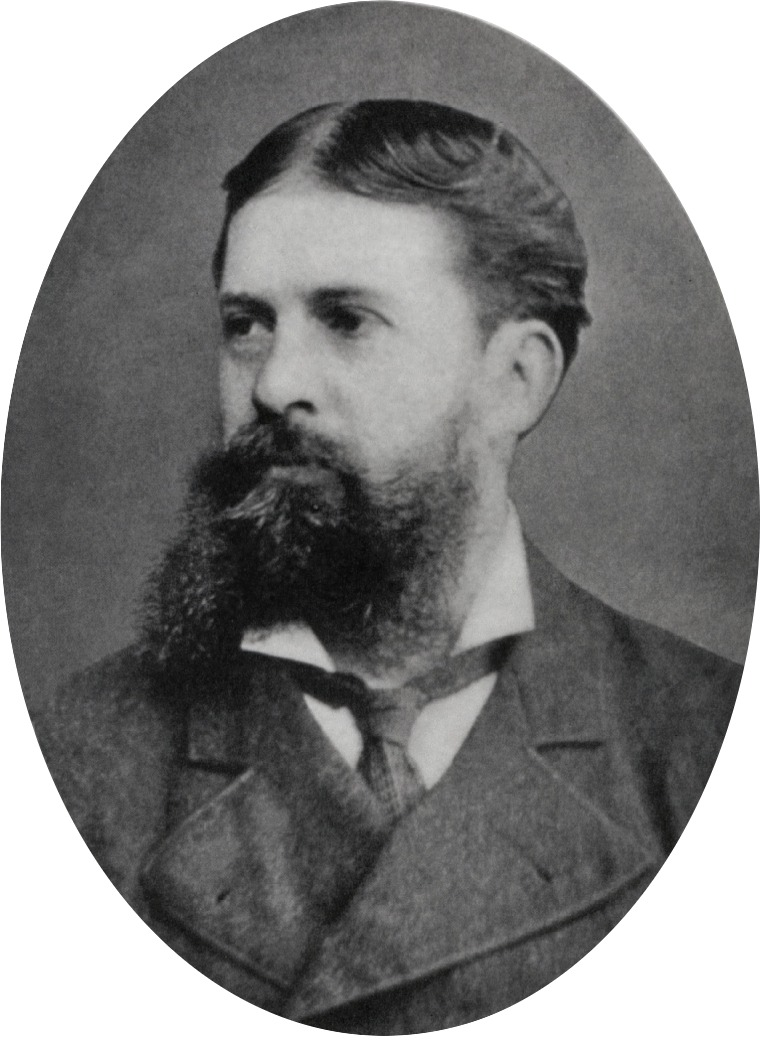
Charles Sanders Peirce, an American polymath and the first self-identified pragmatist

Pragmatism is a philosophical tradition that views language and thought as tools for prediction, problem solving, and action, rather than describing, representing, or mirroring reality. Pragmatists contend that most philosophical topics—such as the nature of knowledge, language, concepts, meaning, belief, and science—are best viewed in terms of their practical uses and successes.

Pragmatism began in the United States in the 1870s. Its origins are often attributed to philosophers Charles Sanders Peirce, William James and John Dewey. In 1878, Peirce described it in his pragmatic maxim: "Consider the practical effects of the objects of your conception. Then, your conception of those effects is the whole of your conception of the object."

== Origins ==
Pragmatism as a philosophical movement began in the United States around 1870. Charles Sanders Peirce (and his pragmatic maxim) is given credit for its development, along with later 20th-century contributors, William James and John Dewey. Its direction was determined by The Metaphysical Club members Peirce, Dewey, James, Chauncey Wright and George Herbert Mead.

The word pragmatic has existed in English since the 1500s, borrowed from French and derived from Greek via Latin. The Greek word pragma, meaning business, deed or act, is a noun derived from the verb prassein, to do. The first use in print of the name pragmatism was in 1898 by James, who credited Peirce with coining the term during the early 1870s. James regarded Peirce's "Illustrations of the Logic of Science" series—including "The Fixation of Belief" (1877), and especially "How to Make Our Ideas Clear" (1878)—as the foundation of pragmatism. Peirce in turn wrote in 1906 that Nicholas St. John Green had been instrumental by emphasizing the importance of applying Alexander Bain's definition of belief, which was "that upon which a man is prepared to act". Peirce wrote that "from this definition, pragmatism is scarce more than a corollary; so that I am disposed to think of him as the grandfather of pragmatism". John Shook has said, "Chauncey Wright also deserves considerable credit, for as both Peirce and James recall, it was Wright who demanded a phenomenalist and fallibilist empiricism as an alternative to rationalistic speculation."

Peirce developed the idea that inquiry depends on real doubt, not mere verbal or hyperbolic doubt, and said that, in order to understand a conception in a fruitful way, "Consider the practical effects of the objects of your conception. Then, your conception of those effects is the whole of your conception of the object", which he later called the pragmatic maxim. It equates any conception of an object to the general extent of the conceivable implications for informed practice of that object's effects. This is the heart of his pragmatism as a method of experimentational mental reflection arriving at conceptions in terms of conceivable confirmatory and disconfirmatory circumstances—a method hospitable to the generation of explanatory hypotheses, and conducive to the employment and improvement of verification. Typical of Peirce is his concern with inference to explanatory hypotheses as outside the usual foundational alternative between deductivist rationalism and inductivist empiricism, although he was a mathematical logician and a founder of statistics.

Peirce lectured and further wrote on pragmatism to make clear his own interpretation. While framing a conception's meaning in terms of conceivable tests, Peirce emphasized that, since a conception is general, its meaning, its intellectual purport, equates to its acceptance's implications for general practice, rather than to any definite set of real effects (or test results); a conception's clarified meaning points toward its conceivable verifications, but the outcomes are not meanings, but individual upshots. Peirce in 1905 coined the new name pragmaticism "for the precise purpose of expressing the original definition", saying that "all went happily" with James's and F. C. S. Schiller's variant uses of the old name "pragmatism" and that he nonetheless coined the new name because of the old name's growing use in "literary journals, where it gets abused". Yet in a 1906 manuscript, he cited as causes his differences with James and Schiller and, in a 1908 publication, his differences with James as well as literary author Giovanni Papini. Peirce regarded his own views that truth is immutable and infinity is real, as being opposed by the other pragmatists, but he remained allied with them about the falsity of necessitarianism and about the reality of generals and habits understood in terms of potential concrete effects even if unactualized.

Pragmatism enjoyed renewed attention after Willard Van Orman Quine and Wilfrid Sellars used a revised pragmatism to criticize logical positivism in the 1960s. Inspired by the work of Quine and Sellars, a brand of pragmatism known sometimes as neopragmatism gained influence through Richard Rorty, the most influential of the late 20th century pragmatists along with Hilary Putnam and Robert Brandom. Contemporary pragmatism may be broadly divided into a strict analytic tradition and a "neo-classical" pragmatism (such as Susan Haack) that adheres to the work of Peirce, James, and Dewey.

== Core tenets ==
A few of the various but often interrelated positions characteristic of philosophers working from a pragmatist approach include:

- Epistemology (justification): a coherentist theory of justification that rejects the claim that all knowledge and justified belief rest ultimately on a foundation of noninferential knowledge or justified belief. Coherentists hold that justification is solely a function of some relationship between beliefs, none of which are privileged beliefs in the way maintained by foundationalist theories of justification.
- Epistemology (truth): a deflationary or pragmatic theory of truth; the former is the epistemological claim that assertions that predicate the truth of a statement do not attribute a property called truth to such a statement while the latter is the epistemological claim that assertions that predicate the truth of a statement attribute the property of useful-to-believe to such a statement.
- Metaphysics: a pluralist view that there is more than one sound way to conceptualize the world and its content.
- Philosophy of science: an instrumentalist and scientific anti-realist view that a scientific concept or theory should be evaluated by how effectively it explains and predicts phenomena, as opposed to how accurately it describes objective reality.
- Philosophy of language: an anti-representationalist view that rejects analyzing the semantic meaning of propositions, mental states, and statements in terms of a correspondence or representational relationship and instead analyzes semantic meaning in terms of notions like dispositions to action, inferential relationships, and/or functional roles (e.g. behaviorism and inferentialism). Not to be confused with pragmatics, a sub-field of linguistics with no relation to philosophical pragmatism.
- Additionally, forms of empiricism, fallibilism, verificationism, and a Quinean naturalist metaphilosophy are all commonly elements of pragmatist philosophies. Many pragmatists are epistemological relativists and see this to be an important facet of their pragmatism (e.g. Joseph Margolis), but this is controversial and other pragmatists argue such relativism to be seriously misguided (e.g. Hilary Putnam, Susan Haack).

=== Anti-reification of concepts and theories ===
Dewey in The Quest for Certainty criticized what he called "the philosophical fallacy": Philosophers often take categories (such as the mental and the physical) for granted because they don't realize that these are nominal concepts that were invented to help solve specific problems. This causes metaphysical and conceptual confusion. Various examples are the "ultimate Being" of Hegelian philosophers, the belief in a "realm of value", the idea that logic, because it is an abstraction from concrete thought, has nothing to do with the action of concrete thinking.

David L. Hildebrand summarized the problem: "Perceptual inattention to the specific functions comprising inquiry led realists and idealists alike to formulate accounts of knowledge that project the products of extensive abstraction back onto experience."

=== Naturalism and anti-Cartesianism ===
From the outset, pragmatists wanted to reform philosophy and bring it more in line with the scientific method as they understood it. They argued that idealist and realist philosophy had a tendency to present human knowledge as something beyond what science could grasp. They held that these philosophies then resorted either to a phenomenology inspired by Kant or to correspondence theories of knowledge and truth. Pragmatists criticized the former for its a priorism, and the latter because it takes correspondence as an unanalyzable fact. Pragmatism instead tries to explain the relation between knower and known.

In 1868, C.S. Peirce argued that there is no power of intuition in the sense of a cognition unconditioned by inference, and no power of introspection, intuitive or otherwise, and that awareness of an internal world is by hypothetical inference from external facts. Introspection and intuition were staple philosophical tools at least since Descartes. He argued that there is no absolutely first cognition in a cognitive process; such a process has its beginning but can always be analyzed into finer cognitive stages. That which we call introspection does not give privileged access to knowledge about the mind—the self is a concept that is derived from our interaction with the external world and not the other way around. At the same time he held persistently that pragmatism and epistemology in general could not be derived from principles of psychology understood as a special science: what we do think is too different from what we should think; in his "Illustrations of the Logic of Science" series, Peirce formulated both pragmatism and principles of statistics as aspects of scientific method in general. This is an important point of disagreement with most other pragmatists, who advocate a more thorough naturalism and psychologism.

Richard Rorty expanded on these and other arguments in Philosophy and the Mirror of Nature in which he criticized attempts by many philosophers of science to carve out a space for epistemology that is entirely unrelated to—and sometimes thought of as superior to—the empirical sciences. W.V. Quine, who was instrumental in bringing naturalized epistemology back into favor with his essay "Epistemology Naturalized", also criticized "traditional" epistemology and its "Cartesian dream" of absolute certainty. The dream, he argued, was impossible in practice as well as misguided in theory, because it separates epistemology from scientific inquiry.

=== Reconciliation of anti-skepticism and fallibilism ===
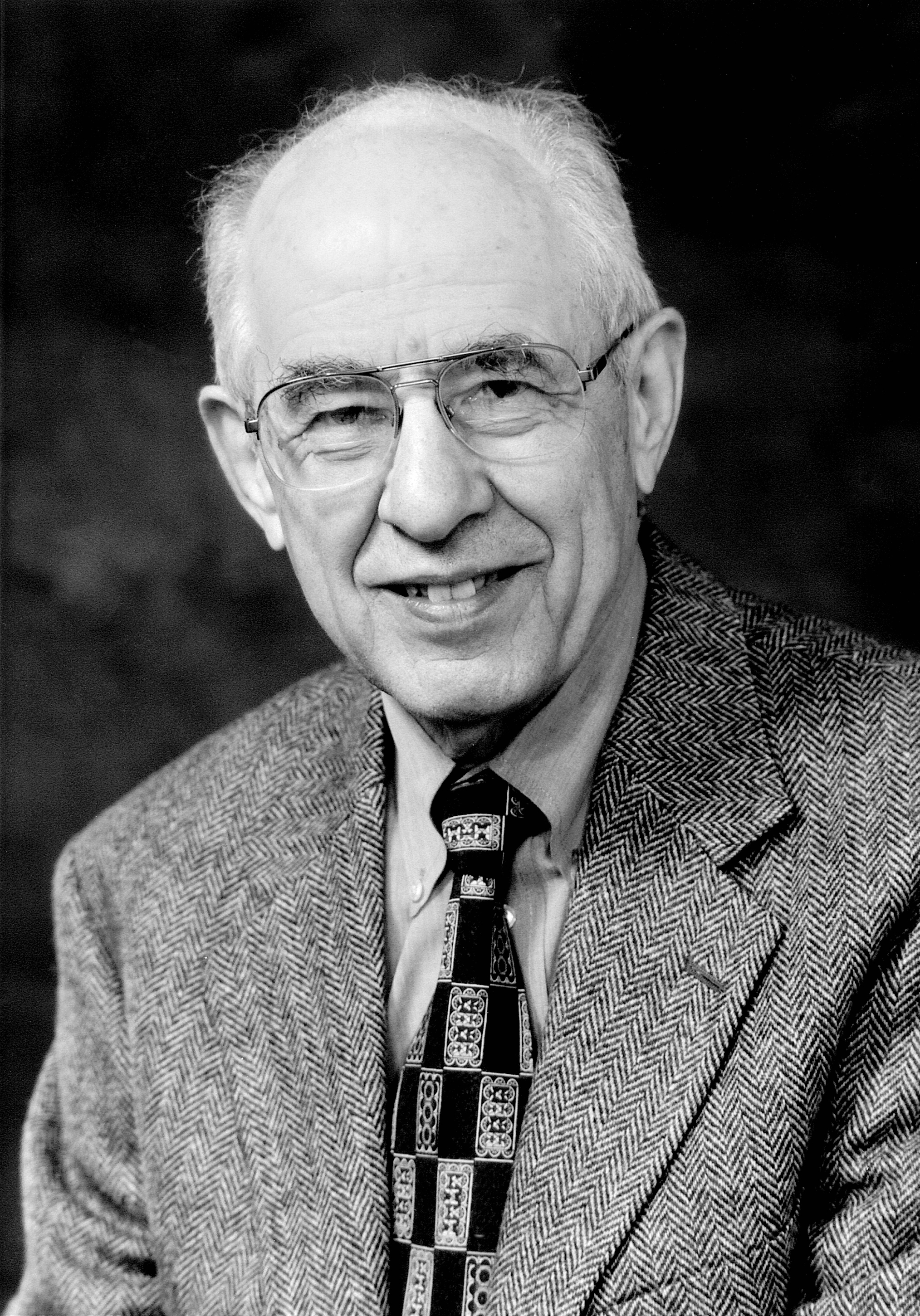
Hilary Putnam said that the combination of antiskepticism and fallibilism is a central feature of pragmatism.

Hilary Putnam has suggested that the reconciliation of anti-skepticism and fallibilism is the central goal of American pragmatism. Although all human knowledge is partial, with no ability to take a "God's-eye-view", this does not necessitate a globalized skeptical attitude, a radical philosophical skepticism (as distinguished from that which is called scientific skepticism). Peirce insisted that (1) in reasoning, there is the presupposition, and at least the hope, that truth and the real are discoverable and would be discovered, sooner or later but still inevitably, by investigation taken far enough, and (2) contrary to Descartes's famous and influential methodology in the Meditations on First Philosophy, doubt cannot be feigned or created by verbal fiat to motivate fruitful inquiry, and much less can philosophy begin in universal doubt. Doubt, like belief, requires justification. Genuine doubt irritates and inhibits, in the sense that belief is that upon which one is prepared to act. It arises from confrontation with some specific recalcitrant matter of fact (which Dewey called a "situation"), which unsettles our belief in some specific proposition. Inquiry is then the rationally self-controlled process of attempting to return to a settled state of belief about the matter. Note that anti-skepticism is a reaction to modern academic skepticism in the wake of Descartes. The pragmatist insistence that all knowledge is tentative is quite congenial to the older skeptical tradition.

=== Theory of truth and epistemology ===
Pragmatism was not the first to apply evolution to theories of knowledge: Schopenhauer advocated a biological idealism as what's useful to an organism to believe might differ wildly from what is true. Here knowledge and action are portrayed as two separate spheres with an absolute or transcendental truth above and beyond any sort of inquiry organisms used to cope with life. Pragmatism challenges this idealism by providing an "ecological" account of knowledge: inquiry is how organisms can get a grip on their environment. Real and true are functional labels in inquiry and cannot be understood outside of this context. It is not realist in a traditionally robust sense of realism (what Hilary Putnam later called metaphysical realism), but it is realist in how it acknowledges an external world which must be dealt with.

Many of James' best-turned phrases—"truth's cash value" and "the true is only the expedient in our way of thinking" —were taken out of context and caricatured in contemporary literature as representing the view where any idea with practical utility is true. William James wrote:

It is high time to urge the use of a little imagination in philosophy. The unwillingness of some of our critics to read any but the silliest of possible meanings into our statements is as discreditable to their imaginations as anything I know in recent philosophic history. Schiller says the truth is that which "works." Thereupon he is treated as one who limits verification to the lowest material utilities. Dewey says truth is what gives "satisfaction"! He is treated as one who believes in calling everything true which, if it were true, would be pleasant.

In reality, James asserts, the theory is a great deal more subtle. (Note: See Dewey 1910 for a "FAQ.")

The role of belief in representing reality is widely debated in pragmatism. Is a belief valid when it represents reality? "Copying is one (and only one) genuine mode of knowing". Are beliefs dispositions which qualify as true or false depending on how helpful they prove in inquiry and in action? Is it only in the struggle of intelligent organisms with the surrounding environment that beliefs acquire meaning? Does a belief only become true when it succeeds in this struggle? In James's pragmatism nothing practical or useful is held to be necessarily true nor is anything which helps to survive merely in the short term. For example, to believe my cheating spouse is faithful may help me feel better now, but it is certainly not useful from a more long-term perspective because it doesn't accord with the facts (and is therefore not true).

== In other fields ==
While pragmatism started simply as a criterion of meaning, it quickly expanded to become a full-fledged epistemology with wide-ranging implications for the entire philosophical field. Pragmatists who work in these fields share a common inspiration, but their work is diverse and there are no received views.

=== Philosophy of science ===
In the philosophy of science, instrumentalism is the view that concepts and theories are merely useful instruments and progress in science cannot be couched in terms of concepts and theories somehow mirroring reality. Instrumentalist philosophers often define scientific progress as nothing more than an improvement in explaining and predicting phenomena. Instrumentalism does not state that truth does not matter, but rather provides a specific answer to the question of what truth and falsity mean and how they function in science.

One of C. I. Lewis' main arguments in Mind and the World Order: Outline of a Theory of Knowledge (1929) was that science does not merely provide a copy of reality but must work with conceptual systems and that those are chosen for pragmatic reasons, that is, because they aid inquiry. Lewis' own development of multiple modal logics is a case in point. Lewis is sometimes called a proponent of conceptual pragmatism because of this.

Another development is the cooperation of logical positivism and pragmatism in the works of Charles W. Morris and Rudolf Carnap. The influence of pragmatism on these writers is mostly limited to the incorporation of the pragmatic maxim into their epistemology. Pragmatists with a broader conception of the movement do not often refer to them.

W. V. Quine's paper "Two Dogmas of Empiricism", published in 1951, is one of the most celebrated papers of 20th-century philosophy in the analytic tradition. The paper is an attack on two central tenets of the logical positivists' philosophy. One is the distinction between analytic statements (tautologies and contradictions) whose truth (or falsehood) is a function of the meanings of the words in the statement ('all bachelors are unmarried'), and synthetic statements, whose truth (or falsehood) is a function of (contingent) states of affairs. The other is reductionism, the theory that each meaningful statement gets its meaning from some logical construction of terms which refers exclusively to immediate experience. Quine's argument brings to mind Peirce's insistence that axioms are not a priori truths but synthetic statements.

=== Logic ===
Later in his life Schiller became famous for his attacks on logic in his textbook, Formal Logic. By then, Schiller's pragmatism had become the nearest of any of the classical pragmatists to an ordinary language philosophy. Schiller sought to undermine the very possibility of formal logic, by showing that words only had meaning when used in context. The least famous of Schiller's main works was the constructive sequel to his destructive book Formal Logic. In this sequel, Logic for Use, Schiller attempted to construct a new logic to replace the formal logic that he had criticized in Formal Logic. What he offers is something philosophers would recognize today as a logic covering the context of discovery and the hypothetico-deductive method.

Whereas Schiller dismissed the possibility of formal logic, most pragmatists are critical rather of its pretension to ultimate validity and see logic as one logical tool among others—or perhaps, considering the multitude of formal logics, one set of tools among others. This is the view of C. I. Lewis. C. S. Peirce developed multiple methods for doing formal logic.

Stephen Toulmin's The Uses of Argument inspired scholars in informal logic and rhetoric studies (although it is an epistemological work).

=== Metaphysics ===
James and Dewey were empirical thinkers in the most straightforward fashion: experience is the ultimate test and experience is what needs to be explained. They were dissatisfied with ordinary empiricism because, in the tradition dating from Hume, empiricists had a tendency to think of experience as nothing more than individual sensations. To the pragmatists, this went against the spirit of empiricism: we should try to explain all that is given in experience including connections and meaning, instead of explaining them away and positing sense data as the ultimate reality. Radical empiricism, or Immediate Empiricism in Dewey's words, wants to give a place to meaning and value instead of explaining them away as subjective additions to a world of whizzing atoms.

The "Chicago Club" including Mead, Dewey, Angell, and Moore. Pragmatism is sometimes called American pragmatism because so many of its proponents were and are Americans.

William James gives an interesting example of this philosophical shortcoming:

[A young graduate] began by saying that he had always taken for granted that when you entered a philosophic classroom you had to open relations with a universe entirely distinct from the one you left behind you in the street. The two were supposed, he said, to have so little to do with each other, that you could not possibly occupy your mind with them at the same time. The world of concrete personal experiences to which the street belongs is multitudinous beyond imagination, tangled, muddy, painful and perplexed. The world to which your philosophy-professor introduces you is simple, clean and noble. The contradictions of real life are absent from it. ... In point of fact it is far less an account of this actual world than a clear addition built upon it ... It is no explanation of our concrete universe.

F. C. S. Schiller's first book Riddles of the Sphinx was published before he became aware of the growing pragmatist movement taking place in America. In it, Schiller argues for a middle ground between materialism and absolute metaphysics. These opposites are comparable to what William James called tough-minded empiricism and tender-minded rationalism. Schiller contends on the one hand that mechanistic naturalism cannot make sense of the "higher" aspects of our world. These include free will, consciousness, purpose, universals and some would add God. On the other hand, abstract metaphysics cannot make sense of the "lower" aspects of our world (e.g. the imperfect, change, physicality). While Schiller is vague about the exact sort of middle ground he is trying to establish, he suggests that metaphysics is a tool that can aid inquiry, but that it is valuable only insofar as it does help in explanation.

In the second half of the 20th century, Stephen Toulmin argued that the need to distinguish between reality and appearance only arises within an explanatory scheme and therefore that there is no point in asking what "ultimate reality" consists of. More recently, a similar idea has been suggested by the postanalytic philosopher Daniel Dennett, who argues that anyone who wants to understand the world has to acknowledge both the "syntactical" aspects of reality (i.e., whizzing atoms) and its emergent or "semantic" properties (i.e., meaning and value).

Radical empiricism gives answers to questions about the limits of science, the nature of meaning and value and the workability of reductionism. These questions feature prominently in current debates about the relationship between religion and science, where it is often assumed—most pragmatists would disagree—that science degrades everything that is meaningful into "merely" physical phenomena.

=== Philosophy of mind ===
Both John Dewey in Experience and Nature (1929) and, half a century later, Richard Rorty in his Philosophy and the Mirror of Nature (1979) argued that much of the debate about the relation of the mind to the body results from conceptual confusions. They argue instead that there is no need to posit the mind or mindstuff as an ontological category.

Pragmatists disagree over whether philosophers ought to adopt a quietist or a naturalist stance toward the mind-body problem. The former, including Rorty, want to do away with the problem because they believe it is a pseudo-problem, whereas the latter believe that it is a meaningful empirical question.

=== Ethics ===
Pragmatism sees no fundamental difference between practical and theoretical reason, nor any ontological difference between facts and values. Pragmatist ethics is broadly humanist because it sees no ultimate test of morality beyond what matters for us as humans. Good values are those for which we have good reasons, viz. the good reasons approach. The pragmatist formulation pre-dates those of other philosophers who have stressed important similarities between values and facts such as Jerome Schneewind and John Searle.

William James tried to show the meaningfulness of (some kinds of) spirituality but, like other pragmatists, did not see religion as the basis of meaning or morality.

William James' contribution to ethics, as laid out in his essay The Will to Believe has often been misunderstood as a plea for relativism or irrationality. On its own terms it argues that ethics always involves a certain degree of trust or faith and that we cannot always wait for adequate proof when making moral decisions.

Moral questions immediately present themselves as questions whose solution cannot wait for sensible proof. A moral question is a question not of what sensibly exists, but of what is good, or would be good if it did exist. ... A social organism of any sort whatever, large or small, is what it is because each member proceeds to his own duty with a trust that the other members will simultaneously do theirs. Wherever a desired result is achieved by the co-operation of many independent persons, its existence as a fact is a pure consequence of the precursive faith in one another of those immediately concerned. A government, an army, a commercial system, a ship, a college, an athletic team, all exist on this condition, without which not only is nothing achieved, but nothing is even attempted.

Of the classical pragmatists, John Dewey wrote most extensively about morality and democracy. In his classic article "Three Independent Factors in Morals", he tried to integrate three basic philosophical perspectives on morality: the right, the virtuous and the good. He held that while all three provide meaningful ways to think about moral questions, the possibility of conflict among the three elements cannot always be easily solved.

Dewey also criticized the dichotomy between means and ends which he saw as responsible for the degradation of our everyday working lives and education, both conceived as merely a means to an end. He stressed the need for meaningful labor and a conception of education that viewed it not as a preparation for life but as life itself.

Dewey was opposed to other ethical philosophies of his time, notably the emotivism of Alfred Ayer. Dewey envisioned the possibility of ethics as an experimental discipline, and thought values could best be characterized not as feelings or imperatives, but as hypotheses about what actions will lead to satisfactory results or what he termed consummatory experience. An additional implication of this view is that ethics is a fallible undertaking because human beings are frequently unable to know what would satisfy them.

During the late 1900s and first decade of 2000, pragmatism was embraced by many in the field of bioethics led by the philosophers John Lachs and his student Glenn McGee, whose 1997 book The Perfect Baby: A Pragmatic Approach to Genetic Engineering (see designer baby) garnered praise from within classical American philosophy and criticism from bioethics for its development of a theory of pragmatic bioethics and its rejection of the principalism theory then in vogue in medical ethics. An anthology published by the MIT Press titled Pragmatic Bioethics included the responses of philosophers to that debate, including Micah Hester, Griffin Trotter and others many of whom developed their own theories based on the work of Dewey, Peirce, Royce and others. Lachs developed several applications of pragmatism to bioethics independent of but extending from the work of Dewey and James.

One of the few ethics textbooks completely in a pragmatic key is Oxford's A 21st Century Ethical Toolbox by Anthony Weston and Bob Fischer. A pragmatist contribution to meta-ethics is Todd Lekan's Making Morality. Lekan argues that morality is a fallible but rational practice and that it has traditionally been misconceived as based on theory or principles. Instead, he argues, theory and rules arise as tools to make practice more intelligent.

Within the philosophy of war, Robert L. Holmes follows John Dewey's lead by offering a pragmatic insight into just war theory. In this view, the application of just war theory in the modern era is flawed due its reliance upon subjective perceptions of "just" or "unjust" outcomes. Holmes points toward the importance of transcending such a dualistic analysis by adopting a global frame of reference which encompasses the "constellation of social, political, economic, religious and ethical values and practices" which lead to the systematic practice of war over time. He concludes that a universal prima facie moral imperative against killing is sufficient to serve as a rational foundation for a new form of pragmatic "existential pacifism".

=== Aesthetics ===
John Dewey's Art as Experience, based on the William James lectures he delivered at Harvard University, was an attempt to show the integrity of art, culture and everyday experience (IEP). Art, for Dewey, is or should be a part of everyone's creative lives and not just the privilege of a select group of artists. He also emphasizes that the audience is more than a passive recipient. Dewey's treatment of art was a move away from the transcendental approach to aesthetics in the wake of Immanuel Kant who emphasized the unique character of art and the disinterested nature of aesthetic appreciation. A notable contemporary pragmatist aesthetician is Joseph Margolis. He defines a work of art as "a physically embodied, culturally emergent entity", a human "utterance" that isn't an ontological quirk but in line with other human activity and culture in general. He emphasizes that works of art are complex and difficult to fathom, and that no determinate interpretation can be given.

=== Philosophy of religion ===
Both Dewey and James investigated the role that religion can still play in contemporary society, the former in A Common Faith and the latter in The Varieties of Religious Experience.

From a general point of view, for William James, something is true only insofar as it works. Thus, the statement, for example, that prayer is heard may work on a psychological level but (a) may not help to bring about the things you pray for (b) may be better explained by referring to its soothing effect than by claiming prayers are heard. As such, pragmatism is not antithetical to religion but it is not an apologetic for faith either. James' metaphysical position however, leaves open the possibility that the ontological claims of religions may be true. As he observed in the end of the Varieties, his position does not amount to a denial of the existence of transcendent realities. Quite the contrary, he argued for the legitimate epistemic right to believe in such realities, since such beliefs do make a difference in an individual's life and refer to claims that cannot be verified or falsified either on intellectual or common sensorial grounds.

Joseph Margolis in Historied Thought, Constructed World (California, 1995) makes a distinction between "existence" and "reality". He suggests using the term "exists" only for those things which adequately exhibit Peirce's Secondness: things which offer brute physical resistance to our movements. In this way, such things which affect us, like numbers, may be said to be "real", although they do not "exist". Margolis suggests that God, in such a linguistic usage, might very well be "real", causing believers to act in such and such a way, but might not "exist".

=== Education ===
Pragmatic pedagogy is an educational philosophy that emphasizes teaching students knowledge that is practical for life and encourages them to grow into better people. American philosopher John Dewey is considered one of the main thinkers of the pragmatist educational approach.

== Neopragmatism ==
Neopragmatism is a broad contemporary category used for various thinkers that incorporate important insights of, and yet significantly diverge from, the classical pragmatists. This divergence may occur either in their philosophical methodology (many of them are loyal to the analytic tradition) or in conceptual formation: for example, conceptual pragmatist C. I. Lewis was very critical of Dewey; neopragmatist Richard Rorty disliked Peirce.

Important analytic pragmatists include early Richard Rorty (who was the first to develop neopragmatist philosophy in his Philosophy and the Mirror of Nature (1979), Hilary Putnam, W. V. O. Quine, and Donald Davidson. Brazilian social thinker Roberto Unger advocates for a radical pragmatism, one that "de-naturalizes" society and culture, and thus insists that we can "transform the character of our relation to social and cultural worlds we inhabit rather than just to change, little by little, the content of the arrangements and beliefs that comprise them". Late Rorty and Jürgen Habermas are closer to Continental thought.

Neopragmatist thinkers who are more loyal to classical pragmatism include Sidney Hook and Susan Haack (known for the theory of foundherentism). Many pragmatist ideas (especially those of Peirce) find a natural expression in the decision-theoretic reconstruction of epistemology pursued in the work of Isaac Levi. Nicholas Rescher advocated his version of methodological pragmatism, based on construing pragmatic efficacy not as a replacement for truths but as a means to its evidentiation. Rescher was also a proponent of pragmatic idealism.

Not all pragmatists are easily characterized. With the advent of postanalytic philosophy and the diversification of Anglo-American philosophy, many philosophers were influenced by pragmatist thought without necessarily publicly committing themselves to that philosophical school. Daniel Dennett, a student of Quine's, falls into this category, as does Stephen Toulmin, who arrived at his philosophical position via Wittgenstein, whom he calls "a pragmatist of a sophisticated kind". Another example is Mark Johnson whose embodied philosophy shares its psychologism, direct realism and anti-cartesianism with pragmatism. Conceptual pragmatism is a theory of knowledge originating with the work of the philosopher and logician Clarence Irving Lewis. The epistemology of conceptual pragmatism was first formulated in the 1929 book Mind and the World Order: Outline of a Theory of Knowledge.

French pragmatism is attended with theorists such as Michel Callon, Bruno Latour, Michel Crozier, Luc Boltanski, and Laurent Thévenot. It often is seen as opposed to structural problems connected to the French critical theory of Pierre Bourdieu. French pragmatism has more recently made inroads into American sociology and anthropology as well.

Philosophers John R. Shook and Tibor Solymosi said that "each new generation rediscovers and reinvents its own versions of pragmatism by applying the best available practical and scientific methods to philosophical problems of contemporary concern".

== Legacy and contemporary relevance ==
In the 20th century, the movements of logical positivism and ordinary language philosophy have similarities with pragmatism. Like pragmatism, logical positivism provides a verification criterion of meaning that is supposed to eliminate the need for nonsense metaphysics; however, logical positivism doesn't stress action as pragmatism does. The pragmatists rarely used their maxim of meaning to rule out all metaphysics as nonsense. Usually, pragmatism was put forth to correct metaphysical doctrines or to construct empirically verifiable ones rather than to provide a wholesale rejection.

According to Gilbert Ryle, James' pragmatism was "one minor source of the Principle of Verifiability".

Ordinary language philosophy is closer to pragmatism than other philosophy of language because of its nominalist character (although Peirce's pragmatism is not nominalist) and because it takes the broader functioning of language in an environment as its focus instead of investigating abstract relations between language and world.

Pragmatism has ties to process philosophy. Much of the classical pragmatists' work developed in dialogue with process philosophers such as Henri Bergson and Alfred North Whitehead, who aren't usually considered pragmatists because they differ so much on other points. Nonetheless, philosopher Donovan Irven argues there's a strong connection between Henri Bergson, pragmatist William James, and the existentialist Jean-Paul Sartre regarding their theories of truth.

Behaviorism and functionalism in psychology and sociology also have ties to pragmatism, which is not surprising considering that James and Dewey were both scholars of psychology and that Mead became a sociologist.

Pragmatism emphasizes the connection between thought and action. Applied fields like public administration, political science, leadership studies, international relations, conflict resolution, and research methodology have incorporated the tenets of pragmatism in their field. Often this connection is made using Dewey and Addams's expansive notion of democracy.

=== Effects on social sciences ===
In the early 20th century, Symbolic interactionism, a major perspective within sociological social psychology, was derived from pragmatism, especially the work of George Herbert Mead and Charles Cooley as well as the work of Peirce and William James.

Increasing attention is being given to pragmatist epistemology in other branches of the social sciences, which have struggled with divisive debates over the status of social scientific knowledge.

Proponents suggest that pragmatism offers an approach that is both pluralist and practical.

=== Effects on public administration ===
The classical pragmatism of John Dewey, William James, and Charles Sanders Peirce has influenced research in the field of public administration. Scholars claim classical pragmatism had a profound influence on the origin of the field of public administration. At the most basic level, public administrators are responsible for making programs "work" in a pluralistic, problems-oriented environment. Public administrators are also responsible for the day-to-day work with citizens. Dewey's participatory democracy can be applied in this environment. Dewey and James' notion of theory as a tool, helps administrators craft theories to resolve policy and administrative problems. Further, the birth of American public administration coincides closely with the period of greatest influence of the classical pragmatists.

Which pragmatism (classical pragmatism or neo-pragmatism) makes the most sense in public administration has been the source of debate. The debate began when Patricia M. Shields introduced Dewey's notion of the Community of Inquiry. Hugh Miller objected to one element of the community of inquiry (problematic situation, scientific attitude, participatory democracy): scientific attitude. A debate that included responses from a practitioner, an economist, a planner, other public administration scholars, and noted philosophers followed. Miller and Shields also responded.

In addition, applied scholarship of public administration that assesses charter schools, contracting out or outsourcing, financial management, performance measurement, urban quality of life initiatives, and urban planning in part draws on the ideas of classical pragmatism in the development of the conceptual framework and focus of analysis.

The health sector's administrators' use of pragmatism has been criticized as incomplete in its pragmatism, however, according to the classical pragmatists, knowledge is always shaped by human interests. The administrator's focus on "outcomes" simply advances their own interest, and this focus on outcomes often undermines their citizen's interests, which often are more concerned with process. On the other hand, David Brendel argues that pragmatism's ability to bridge dualisms, focus on practical problems, include multiple perspectives, incorporate participation from interested parties (patient, family, health team), and provisional nature makes it well suited to address problems in this area.

=== Effects on feminism ===
Since the mid-1990s, feminist philosophers have re-discovered classical pragmatism as a source of feminist theories. Works by Seigfried, Duran, Keith, and Whipps explore the historic and philosophic links between feminism and pragmatism. The connection between pragmatism and feminism took so long to be rediscovered because pragmatism itself was eclipsed by logical positivism during the middle decades of the twentieth century. As a result, it was lost from feminist discourse. Feminists now consider pragmatism's greatest strength to be the very features that led to its decline. These are "persistent and early criticisms of positivist interpretations of scientific methodology; disclosure of value dimension of factual claims"; viewing aesthetics as informing everyday experience; subordinating logical analysis to political, cultural, and social issues; linking the dominant discourses with domination; "realigning theory with praxis; and resisting the turn to epistemology and instead emphasizing concrete experience".

Feminist philosophers point to Jane Addams as a founder of classical pragmatism. Mary Parker Follett was also an important feminist pragmatist concerned with organizational operation during the early decades of the 20th century. In addition, the ideas of Dewey, Mead, and James are consistent with many feminist tenets. Jane Addams, John Dewey, and George Herbert Mead developed their philosophies as all three became friends, influenced each other, and were engaged in the Hull House experience and women's rights causes.

== Criticisms ==
In the 1908 essay "The Thirteen Pragmatisms", Arthur Oncken Lovejoy argued that there's significant ambiguity in the notion of the effects of the truth of a proposition and those of belief in a proposition in order to highlight that many pragmatists had failed to recognize that distinction. He identified 13 different philosophical positions that were each labeled pragmatism.

The Franciscan friar Celestine Bittle presented multiple criticisms of pragmatism in his 1936 book Reality and the Mind: Epistemology. He argued that, in William James's pragmatism, truth is entirely subjective and is not the widely accepted definition of truth, which is correspondence to reality. For Bittle, defining truth as what is useful is a "perversion of language". With truth reduced essentially to what is good, it is no longer an object of the intellect. Therefore, the problem of knowledge posed by the intellect is not solved, but rather renamed. Renaming truth as a product of the will cannot help it solve the problems of the intellect, according to Bittle. Bittle cited what he saw as contradictions in pragmatism, such as using objective facts to prove that truth does not emerge from objective fact; this reveals that pragmatists do recognize truth as objective fact, and not, as they claim, what is useful. Bittle argued there are also some statements that cannot be judged on human welfare at all. Such statements (for example the assertion that "a car is passing") are matters of "truth and error" and do not affect human welfare.

British philosopher Bertrand Russell devoted a chapter each to James and Dewey in his 1945 book A History of Western Philosophy; Russell pointed out areas in which he agreed with them but also ridiculed James's views on truth and Dewey's views on inquiry. Hilary Putnam later argued that Russell "presented a mere caricature" of James's views and a "misreading of James", while Tom Burke argued at length that Russell presented "a skewed characterization of Dewey's point of view". Elsewhere, in Russell's book The Analysis of Mind, Russell praised James's radical empiricism, to which Russell's own account of neutral monism was indebted. Dewey, in The Bertrand Russell Case, defended Russell against an attempt to remove Russell from his chair at the College of the City of New York in 1940.

Neopragmatism as represented by Richard Rorty has been criticized as relativistic both by other neopragmatists such as Susan Haack and by many analytic philosophers. Rorty's early analytic work, however, differs notably from his later work which some, including Rorty, consider to be closer to literary criticism than to philosophy, and which attracts the brunt of criticism from his detractors. Rorty has defended his views against charges of relativism by claiming that such charges simply beg the question. The people who accuse him of being a relativist presuppose the relative–absolute, appearance–reality, made–found, etc. dualisms, their rejection being a defining feature of pragmatism to begin with. For the pragmatist, relativism about truth makes as little sense as absolutism about truth, since they do not believe in a metaphysical, extra-linguistic Truth which exists outside human vocabularies. Rorty instead believes that scientific, philosophical, and moral progress is made through conversation about which vocabularies are best at solving society's problems.

Richard Hofstadter in his book Anti-intellectualism in American Life argued Pragmatism is a purveyor of anti-intellectualism in American culture because it urges people to choose what works in practice only rather than engaging in abstract critical thinking.

== List of pragmatists ==
=== Classical (1850–1950) ===
Name	Lifetime	Notes
Charles Sanders Peirce	1839–1914	was the founder of American pragmatism (later called by Peirce pragmaticism). He wrote on a wide range of topics, from mathematical logic and semiotics to psychology.
William James	1842–1910	influential psychologist and theorist of religion as well as philosopher. First to be widely associated with the term "pragmatism" due to Peirce's lifelong unpopularity.
John Dewey	1859–1952	prominent philosopher of education, referred to his brand of pragmatism as instrumentalism.
Jane Addams	1860–1935	social reformer, pacifist, her settlement activism deeply inspired James and especially Dewey, who often included her writings on reading lists for his students.
Oliver Wendell Holmes Jr.	1841–1935	U.S. Supreme Court Associate Justice.
F. C. S. Schiller	1864–1937	one of the most important pragmatists of his time, Schiller is largely forgotten today.
Edgar Arthur Singer, Jr.	1873–1954	proponent of experimentalism.

Protopragmatists or related thinkers

Name	Lifetime	Notes
George Herbert Mead	1863–1931	philosopher and sociological social psychologist.
Josiah Royce	1855–1916	colleague of James at Harvard who employed pragmatism in an idealist metaphysical framework, he was particularly interested in the philosophy of religion and community; his work is often associated with neo-Hegelianism.
George Santayana	1863–1952	although he eschewed the label "pragmatism" and called it a "heresy", several critics argue that he applied pragmatist methodologies to naturalism, especially in his early masterwork, The Life of Reason.
W. E. B. Du Bois	1868–1963	student of James at Harvard who applied pragmatist principles to his sociological work, especially in The Philadelphia Negro and Atlanta University Studies.

Other

Name	Lifetime	Notes
Giovanni Papini	1881–1956	Italian essayist, mostly known because James occasionally mentioned him.
Giovanni Vailati	1863–1909	Italian analytic and pragmatist philosopher.
Hu Shih	1891–1962	Chinese intellectual and reformer, student and translator of Dewey's and advocate of pragmatism in China.
Reinhold Niebuhr	1892–1971	American philosopher and theologian, inserted pragmatism into his theory of Christian realism.

=== Analytic, neo- and other (1950–present) ===
Name	Lifetime	Notes
Richard J. Bernstein	1932–2022	Author of Beyond Objectivism and Relativism: Science, Hermeneutics, and Praxis, The New Constellation: The Ethical-Political Horizons of Modernity/Postmodernity, The Pragmatic Turn
Charles West Churchman	1913–2004	Experimentalist, pioneer of American operations research, and writer on ethics and measurement in systems.
F. Thomas Burke	1950–	Author of What Pragmatism Was (2013), Dewey's New Logic (1994). His work interprets contemporary philosophy of mind, philosophy of language, and philosophical logic through the lens of classical American pragmatism.
Arthur Fine	1937–	Philosopher of Science who proposed the Natural Ontological Attitude to the debate of scientific realism.
Stanley Fish	1938–	Literary and Legal Studies pragmatist. Criticizes Rorty's and Posner's legal theories as "almost pragmatism" and authored the afterword in the collection The Revival of Pragmatism.
Robert Brandom	1950–	A student of Rorty, has developed a complex analytic version of pragmatism in works such as Making It Explicit, Between Saying and Doing, and Perspectives on Pragmatism.
Robert L. Holmes	1935-	Professor Emeritus, University of Rochester, advocates a form of pragmatic "existential pacifism" in Pacifism: A Philosophy of Nonviolence (2016)
Clarence Irving Lewis	1883–1964	a leading authority on symbolic logic and on the philosophic concepts of knowledge and value.
Joseph Margolis	1924–2021	still proudly defends the original Pragmatists and sees his recent work on Cultural Realism as extending and deepening their insights, especially the contribution of Peirce and Dewey, in the context of a rapprochement with Continental philosophy.
Hilary Putnam	1926–2016	in many ways the opposite of Rorty and thinks classical pragmatism was too permissive a theory.
Huw Price	1953–	Originally a philosopher of physics and probability, Price has defended explicitly pragmatist positions under the headings of "global expressivism" and "subject naturalism".
Richard Rorty	1931–2007	famous author of Philosophy and the Mirror of Nature.
John J. Stuhr	1951–	
Willard van Orman Quine	1908–2000	pragmatist philosopher, concerned with language, logic, and philosophy of mathematics.
Mike Sandbothe	1961–	Applied Rorty's neopragmatism to media studies and developed a new branch that he called media philosophy. Together with authors such as Juergen Habermas, Hans Joas, Sami Pihlstroem, Mats Bergmann, Michael Esfeld, and Helmut Pape, he belongs to a group of European pragmatists who make use of Peirce, James, Dewey, Rorty, Brandom, Putnam, and other representatives of American pragmatism in continental philosophy.
Richard Shusterman	1949–	philosopher of art.
Jason Stanley	1969–	Defends a pragmatist form of contextualism against semantic varieties of contextualism in his Knowledge and Practical Interest.
Robert B. Talisse	1970–	defends an epistemological conception of democratic politics that is explicitly opposed to Deweyan democracy and yet rooted in a conception of social epistemology that derives from the pragmatism of Charles Peirce. His work in argumentation theory and informal logic also demonstrates pragmatist leanings.
Stephen Toulmin	1922–2009	student of Wittgenstein, known especially for his The Uses of Argument.
Roberto Unger	1947–	in The Self Awakened: Pragmatism Unbound, advocates for a "radical pragmatism", one that "de-naturalizes" society and culture, and thus insists that we can "transform the character of our relation to social and cultural worlds we inhabit rather than just to change, little by little, the content of the arrangements and beliefs that comprise them."
Sidney Hook	1902–1989	a prominent New York intellectual and philosopher, a student of Dewey at Columbia.
Isaac Levi	1930–2018	seeks to apply pragmatist thinking in a decision-theoretic perspective.
Susan Haack	1945–	teaches at the University of Miami, sometimes called the intellectual granddaughter of C.S. Peirce, known chiefly for foundherentism.
Nicholas Rescher	1928–2024	advocates a methodological pragmatism that sees functional efficacy as evidentiating validity.

==== In the extended sense ====
Name	Lifetime	Notes
Cornel West	1953–	thinker on race, politics, and religion; operates under the sign of "prophetic pragmatism".
Wilfrid Sellars	1912–1989	broad thinker, attacked mainstream variants of foundationalism in the analytic tradition.
Frank P. Ramsey	1903–1930	author of the philosophical work Universals.
Karl-Otto Apel	1922–2017	author of "Charles S. Peirce: From Pragmatism to Pragmaticism (1981)"
Randolph Bourne	1886–1918	author of the 1917 pragmatist anti-war essay "Twilight of Idols"
C. Wright Mills	1916–1962	author of Sociology and Pragmatism: The Higher Learning in America and was a commentator on Dewey.
Jürgen Habermas	1929–2026	author of "What Is Universal Pragmatics?"

== See also ==
- American philosophy – Corpus of philosophers of the United States
- Communication Theory as a Field § Russill, pragmatism as an eighth tradition
- Holistic pragmatism

== Sources ==
- Baldwin, James Mark (ed., 1901–1905), Dictionary of Philosophy and Psychology, 3 volumes in 4, Macmillan, New York.
- Dewey, John (1900–1901), Lectures on Ethics 1900–1901, Donald F. Koch (ed.), Southern Illinois University Press, Carbondale and Edwardsville, 1991.
- Dewey, John (1910), How We Think, D.C. Heath, Lexington, MA, 1910. Reprinted, Prometheus Books, Buffalo, NY, 1991.
- Dewey, John (1929), The Quest for Certainty: A Study of the Relation of Knowledge and Action, Minton, Balch, and Company, New York. Reprinted, pp. 1–254 in John Dewey, The Later Works, 1925–1953, Vol. 4: 1929, Jo Ann Boydston (ed.), Harriet Furst Simon (text. ed.), Stephen Toulmin (intro.), Southern Illinois University Press, Carbondale and Edwardsville, 1984.
- Dewey, John (1932), Theory of the Moral Life, Part 2 of John Dewey and James H. Tufts, Ethics, Henry Holt and Company, New York, 1908. 2nd ed., Holt, Rinehart, and Winston, 1932. Reprinted, Arnold Isenberg (ed.), Victor Kestenbaum (pref.), Irvington Publishers, New York, 1980.
- Dewey, John (1938), Logic: The Theory of Inquiry, Henry Holt and Company, New York, 1938. Reprinted, pp. 1–527 in John Dewey, The Later Works, 1925–1953, Vol. 12: 1938, Jo Ann Boydston (ed.), Kathleen Poulos (text. ed.), Ernest Nagel (intro.), Southern Illinois University Press, Carbondale and Edwardsville, 1986.
- James, William (1902), "Pragmatic and Pragmatism", 1 paragraph, vol. 2, pp. 321–322 in J.M. Baldwin (ed., 1901–1905), Dictionary of Philosophy and Psychology, 3 volumes in 4, Macmillan, New York. Reprinted, CP 5.2 in C.S. Peirce, Collected Papers.
- James, William (1907). Pragmatism, A New Name for Some Old Ways of Thinking, Popular Lectures on Philosophy. New York: Longmans, Green, and Company.
- James, William (1909). The Meaning of Truth, A Sequel to 'Pragmatism'. New York: Longmans, Green, and Company.
- Lundin, Roger (2006). From Nature to Experience: The American Search for Cultural Authority. Rowman & Littlefield.
- Peirce, C.S., Collected Papers of Charles Sanders Peirce, vols. 1–6, Charles Hartshorne and Paul Weiss (eds.), vols. 7–8, Arthur W. Burks (ed.), Harvard University Press, Cambridge, MA, 1931–1935, 1958. Cited as CP vol.para.
- Peirce, C.S., The Essential Peirce, Selected Philosophical Writings, Volume 1 (1867–1893), Nathan Houser and Christian Kloesel (eds.), Indiana University Press, Bloomington and Indianapolis, 1992.
- Peirce, C.S., The Essential Peirce, Selected Philosophical Writings, Volume 2 (1893–1913), Peirce Edition Project (eds.), Indiana University Press, Bloomington and Indianapolis, 1998.
- Pretorius, L. (2024). Demystifying research paradigms: Navigating ontology, epistemology, and axiology in research. The Qualitative Report, 29(10), 2698–2715. https://doi.org/10.46743/2160-3715/2024.7632
- Putnam, Hilary (1994). Conant, James (ed.). Words and Life. Cambridge, MA: Harvard University Press.
- Quine, W. V. (January 1951). "Two Dogmas of Empiricism". Philosophical Review. doi:10.2307/2181906. JSTOR 2181906.
  - Quine, W. V. (1980). From a Logical Point of View: Logico-Philosophical Essays. pp. 20–46.
- Quine, W. V. (1980). From a Logical Point of View: Logico-Philosophical Essays (2nd ed.). Cambridge, MA: Harvard University Press.
- Ramsey, F. P. (1990). Mellor, David Hugh (ed.). Philosophical Papers. Cambridge: Cambridge University Press.
- Ramsey, F. P.; Moore, G. E. (1927). "Symposium: Facts and Propositions". Proceedings of the Aristotelian Society, Supplementary Volumes. 7: 153–170. doi:10.1093/aristoteliansupp/7.1.153. JSTOR 4106403.
  - Ramsey, F. P. (1990). "Facts and Propositions (1927)". In Mellor, David Hugh (ed.). Philosophical Papers. Cambridge: Cambridge University Press. pp. 34–51.
- Rescher, N. (1977). Methodological Pragmatism. Oxford: Blackwell.
- Rescher, N. (2000). Realistic Pragmatism. Albany: SUNY Press.
