= Philosophy as Cultural Politics =

Philosophy as Cultural Politics: Philosophical Papers
- Author: Richard Rorty
- Language: English
- Published: 2007
- Publication place: United States
- Media type: Print
- ISBN: 978-0521698351

Philosophy as Cultural Politics: Philosophical Papers: v.4 is a 2007 book by the philosopher Richard Rorty. A compilation of selected philosophical papers written by Rorty between 1997 and 2007, it complements three previous selections of his papers.

== Summary ==
Rorty explores the relation between philosophy and culture.

Topics covered include:

1. the changing role of philosophy in Western culture over the course of recent centuries,
2. the role of the imagination in intellectual and moral progress,
3. the notion of 'moral identity',
4. Wittgenstein's claim that the problems of philosophy are linguistic in nature,
5. the irrelevance of cognitive science to philosophy
6. the mistaken idea that philosophers should find the 'place' of such things as consciousness and moral value in a world of physical particles.
