= Philosophy and the Mirror of Nature =

1979 book by Richard Rorty

- Cover of the first edition
- Author: Richard Rorty
- Language: English
- Subject: Philosophy of mind, epistemology, metaphilosophy
- Publisher: Princeton University Press
- Publication date: 1979
- Publication place: United States
- Media type: Print (hardcover and paperback)
- Pages: 401
- ISBN: 0-691-02016-7
- OCLC: 7040341

Philosophy and the Mirror of Nature is a 1979 book by the American philosopher Richard Rorty, in which the author attempts to dissolve modern philosophical problems instead of solving them. Rorty does this by presenting them as pseudo-problems that only exist in the language-game of epistemological projects culminating in analytic philosophy. In a pragmatist gesture, Rorty suggests that philosophy must get past these pseudo-problems if it is to be productive.

== Background ==
By the mid-20th century, interest in the American pragmatist philosopher John Dewey had significantly waned. He has been described as having been "passé in the minds of a preponderance of philosophers from approximately the 1940s through the 1980s," with the publication of Rorty's book playing a role in the resurgence of interest in Dewey. Rorty was rather interested in the history of philosophy and described the book as "very much the old McKeonite trick of taking the larger historical view."

== Summary ==
In Philosophy and the Mirror of Nature, Rorty argues that the history of philosophy is the history of the quest to make sense of the claim that the mind has knowledge of an objective reality, and thus to give philosophy the ability to judge other aspects of culture as being in or out of touch with this reality. He dubs this idea "representationalism" and refers to it using the metaphor of the "mirror of nature," hence the title of the book.

In the introduction, Rorty claims that Ludwig Wittgenstein, Martin Heidegger, and John Dewey are the three most important philosophers of the 20th century; Wittgenstein for his diagnosis of philosophy as a set of linguistic confusions, Heidegger for his historical deconstruction of such confusions, and Dewey for his hopeful prognosis of a post-metaphysical culture. In continuing this quietist and historicist tradition, the book is therapeutic rather than constructive in nature. However, Rorty aims to carry out his therapy by using the arguments of such systematic philosophers as W. V. O. Quine, Wilfrid Sellars, Thomas Kuhn, and Donald Davidson in order to undermine our philosophical intuitions about the mind (mirror), knowledge (mirroring), and philosophy itself (the study of mirroring), and thus to undermine the representationalist picture of the "mirror of nature."

In Part One, titled "Our Glassy Essence," Rorty examines the philosophical notion of the mind as an immaterial, non-spatial entity which is somehow able to have knowledge of things. He first sets out to dissolve the intuition that there is a "mark of the mental" which can be used to categorize things a priori as being either mental or physical. After having shown that the traditional candidates for marks of the mental, namely non-spatiality, intentionality, and phenomenality, fail to justify dualistic intuitions, Rorty declares the mind–body problem to have been dissolved. He then examines the history of the mind from Aristotle to Descartes in order to demonstrate its historical contingency, which he hopes will dissuade future generations from attempting to resurrect the mind–body problem, before presenting his social-linguistic account of incorrigibility about the mental through his "Antipodeans" thought experiment.

In Part Two, titled "Mirroring," Rorty examines the philosophical notion of knowledge as the possession of accurate representations of an objective reality. He first examines the history of this idea, claiming that philosophy only became concerned with a "theory of knowledge" when Locke and Kant confused psychological processes with normative justification. Rorty then argues that Quine's critique of the analytic–synthetic distinction and Sellars's critique of the Myth of the Given both undermine the idea that philosophy holds a privileged position from which it can judge the progress of inquiry. The rejection of such a privileged position leads to a position which Rorty calls "epistemological behaviorism," which states that knowledge and justification are social-linguistic practices, or what Sellars would call having a place in the "logical space of reasons," rather than a matter of representing reality. Rorty also addresses recent attempts by philosophers such as Quine and Jerry Fodor to replace epistemology with psychology, and by Michael Dummett and Hilary Putnam to replace it with philosophy of language, arguing that these attempts ultimately fail in giving sense to representationalism.

In Part Three, titled "Philosophy," Rorty discusses what philosophy could look like after giving up representationalism. Borrowing Kuhn's concept of incommensurability, he claims that philosophy has traditionally sought commensuration, or the grounding of all discourses on a single, ahistorical foundation, but he claims that without a privileged position outside all inquiry, this is impossible, and so different discourses are incommensurable. Rorty instead opts for hermeneutics, which is where instead of seeking commensuration of all discourses, people simply try out different, incommensurable discourses and see which one works best to achieve their goals. This means redefining objectivity as intersubjective consensus rather than as correspondence to the world. Rorty also draws a distinction between systematic and edifying philosophers. Whereas systematic philosophers engage in epistemology and aim to find the "correct" way of speaking, or the one which hooks them up to reality, edifying philosophers engage in hermeneutics and aim to deconstruct all such attempts, instead offering new projects to pursue and new tools to pursue them once inquiry has reached a dead end.

== Reception ==
Philosophy and the Mirror of Nature was seen to be somewhat controversial upon its publication. It had its greatest success outside analytic philosophy, despite its reliance on arguments by Quine and Sellars, and was widely influential in the humanities.

In the decades since its publication, it has seen more appreciation within analytic circles. For example, John McDowell, in the preface to his book Mind and World (1994), states that the initial sketches of the ideas propounded in this work were made "during the winter of 1985–6, in an attempt to get under control my usual excited reaction to a reading—my third or fourth—of Richard Rorty's Philosophy and the Mirror of Nature." He added that it was "obvious that Rorty's work is in any case central for the way I define my stance here".

== See also ==
- Direct and indirect realism
- Neopragmatism
