= Neopragmatism =

Philosophical position developed by Richard Rorty

Neopragmatism (Note: Sometimes called post-Deweyan pragmatism, analytic pragmatism, or linguistic pragmatism.) is a philosophical position developed by the American philosopher Richard Rorty. It is pragmatist in that it is influenced by the classical pragmatism of Charles Sanders Peirce, William James, and John Dewey, while also incorporating the insights of the analytic philosophy which ended up superseding that movement, hence the "neo-" in its name.

Neopragmatism was originally developed by Rorty in his influential book Philosophy and the Mirror of Nature (1979). In this book, Rorty argues that philosophy as traditionally conceived, i.e., as a sort of supreme court of reason overlooking the rest of culture, has become obsolete, having reached an impasse in analytic philosophy, and so philosophy must instead become a more interpretive and culturally relevant discipline if it is to have any relevance at all.

The main lesson to be learned from the classical pragmatists, according to Rorty, is that there is no difference in theory which makes no difference in practice, a sentiment which can be traced all the way back to Peirce's formulation of his pragmatic maxim, and this sentiment is largely the defining characteristic which unites neopragmatists from across the philosophical spectrum.

Another notable philosopher who identified as a neopragmatist later in his career was Hilary Putnam. While Donald Davidson, who was a major influence on and close friend of Rorty, never publicly identified as a pragmatist in any sense, he did notice that his views did not differ that much from Rorty's, with there being more difference between them in terms of style and attitude. The following contemporary philosophers are also often considered to be neopragmatists: Nicholas Rescher (a proponent of methodological pragmatism and pragmatic idealism), Jürgen Habermas, Susan Haack, Robert Brandom, and Cornel West (the latter two being Rorty's students at Princeton).

== Background ==
=== Classical pragmatism ===
Neopragmatists, particularly Rorty and Putnam, draw on the ideas of the classical pragmatists, namely Peirce, James, and Dewey. Putnam, in Words and Life (1994), enumerates the ideas in the classical pragmatist tradition which neopragmatists find most compelling. To paraphrase Putnam:

1. Rejection of skepticism (pragmatists hold that doubt requires justification just as much as belief);
2. Fallibilism (the view that there are no metaphysical guarantees against the need to revise a belief);
3. Anti-dualism about "facts" and "values";
4. That practice, properly construed, is primary in philosophy.

Neopragmatism is distinguished from classical pragmatism (the pragmatism of Peirce, James, and Dewey) primarily due to the influence of the linguistic turn in philosophy that occurred in the early 20th century. The linguistic turn reduced talk of mind, ideas, and the world to language and the world. Philosophers stopped talking about the ideas in one's mind that are used to think about the world, and instead started talking about the words in one's language that are used to talk about the world.

=== Early analytic philosophy ===
In the early 20th century, philosophers of language (e.g. Bertrand Russell, G. E. Moore, the early Wittgenstein, and the logical positivists) believed that analyzing language would bring about the arrival of meaning, objectivity, and ultimately truth concerning external reality, and so they initiated the linguistic turn. In this tradition, it was thought that truth was obtained when linguistic terms stood in a proper correspondence relation to non-linguistic objects (this can be called "representationalism"). The idea was that in order for a statement or proposition to be true, it must represent or correspond to a state of affairs which is actually present in reality. This is the basis behind the correspondence theory of truth and is essentially what neopragmatism formed in opposition to.

=== Later analytic philosophy ===
In the mid-20th century, there were many arguments raised against the methods and assumptions just outlined of the early analytic philosophers. Of particular importance for Rorty are the arguments of W. V. O. Quine, Wilfrid Sellars, Thomas Kuhn, and Donald Davidson.

Here is how Rorty draws on these four philosophers in Philosophy and the Mirror of Nature:

1. Quine's attack on the analytic–synthetic distinction has undermined the notion of a "first philosophy" which is discontinuous with the rest of culture and which stands above inquiry.
2. Sellars's attack on the Myth of the Given has undermined the notion of a "science of knowledge" which aims to secure certain foundations and which stands below inquiry.
3. Kuhn's idea of the paradigm shift has undermined the notion that science is linearly progressing to an objective, value-neutral view of the world, suggesting instead that science is a tool for coping with data.
4. Davidson's attack on scheme–content dualism has undermined the notion that our language aims to represent or fit the world, and thus that we could be in massive error about it (skepticism) or that there could be multiple, equally valid truths (relativism).

According to Rorty, the upshot of all of these arguments is a shift towards holism and pragmatism. Since there is no privileged position either above or below inquiry, and language and science do not aim to accurately represent the world, representationalism no longer seems to be a necessary or even coherent self-image. Rorty suggests that we instead shift to a post-Darwin image of ourselves as clever animals using language as a tool to cope with the environment. Philosophers then take on the edifying role of preventing inquiry from becoming fixed in one paradigm and offering new tools for coping.

=== The later Wittgenstein and language games ===
The later Wittgenstein in Philosophical Investigations (1953) argues, contrary to his earlier views in Tractatus Logico-Philosophicus (1921), that the role of language is not to represent reality but rather to perform certain actions in communities. The language game is the concept Wittgenstein uses to emphasize this. Wittgenstein believed roughly that:

1. Languages are used to obtain certain ends within communities.
2. Each language has its own set of rules and objects to which it refers.
3. Just as board games have rules guiding what moves may be made, so do languages within communities where the moves to be made within a language game are the types of objects that may be talked about intelligibly.
4. Two people participating in two different language games cannot be said to communicate in any relevant way.

Many of the themes found in the later Wittgenstein are found in neopragmatism. Wittgenstein's emphasis on the importance of "use" in language to accomplish communal goals and the problems associated with trying to communicate between two different language games finds much traction in neopragmatist writings.

=== Continental philosophy ===
While Rorty was originally trained as an analytic philosopher, continental philosophers such as Martin Heidegger, Hans-Georg Gadamer, Michel Foucault, and Jacques Derrida and their views on language have been highly influential for him.

In Philosophy and the Mirror of Nature, he employs a genealogical method inspired by Nietzsche and Foucault in order to trace the contingent and historically situated origins of contemporary philosophical problems. In Part Three of the same book, he explicitly draws on the existentialist and hermeneutic traditions of Gadamer and Jean-Paul Sartre to develop his concept of "edifying philosophy".

He also published a collection of essays under the title Essays on Heidegger and Others (1991) in which he explores the similarities and differences between his own neopragmatist philosophy and the views espoused by various continental philosophers.

== Richard Rorty and anti-representationalism ==
As Rorty read his biggest influences (James, Dewey, Wittgenstein, Quine, Sellars, Kuhn, Davidson, Derrida, Heidegger), he started to believe that they were all, in one way or another, trying to hit on the thesis that our language does not represent reality in any metaphysically relevant way. Rather than situating our language in ways in order to get things right or correct, he says in the introduction to Objectivity, Relativism, and Truth (1990) that we should believe that beliefs are only habits which we use to react and adapt to the world. To Rorty, getting things right as they are "in themselves" is useless if not downright meaningless.

In 1995, Rorty wrote, "I linguisticize as many pre-linguistic-turn philosophers as I can, in order to read them as prophets of the utopia in which all metaphysical problems have been dissolved, and religion and science have yielded their place to poetry." This "linguistic turn" strategy aims to avoid what Rorty sees as the essentialisms ("truth," "reality," "experience") still extant in classical pragmatism. Rorty wrote, "Analytic philosophy, thanks to its concentration on language, was able to defend certain crucial pragmatist theses better than James and Dewey themselves. [...] By focusing our attention on the relation between language and the rest of the world rather than between experience and nature, post-positivistic analytic philosophy was able to make a more radical break with the philosophical tradition."

== See also ==
- Pragmatism
- Confirmation holism
- Fallibilism
- Linguistic turn
- Postanalytic philosophy
- Two Dogmas of Empiricism
- The Structure of Scientific Revolutions
- Philosophy and the Mirror of Nature, the foundational text of the tradition
- Contingency, Irony, and Solidarity, another influential book by Rorty
