= Ironist =

== See Also ==
- Ironism
