= Mike Sandbothe =

German philosopher

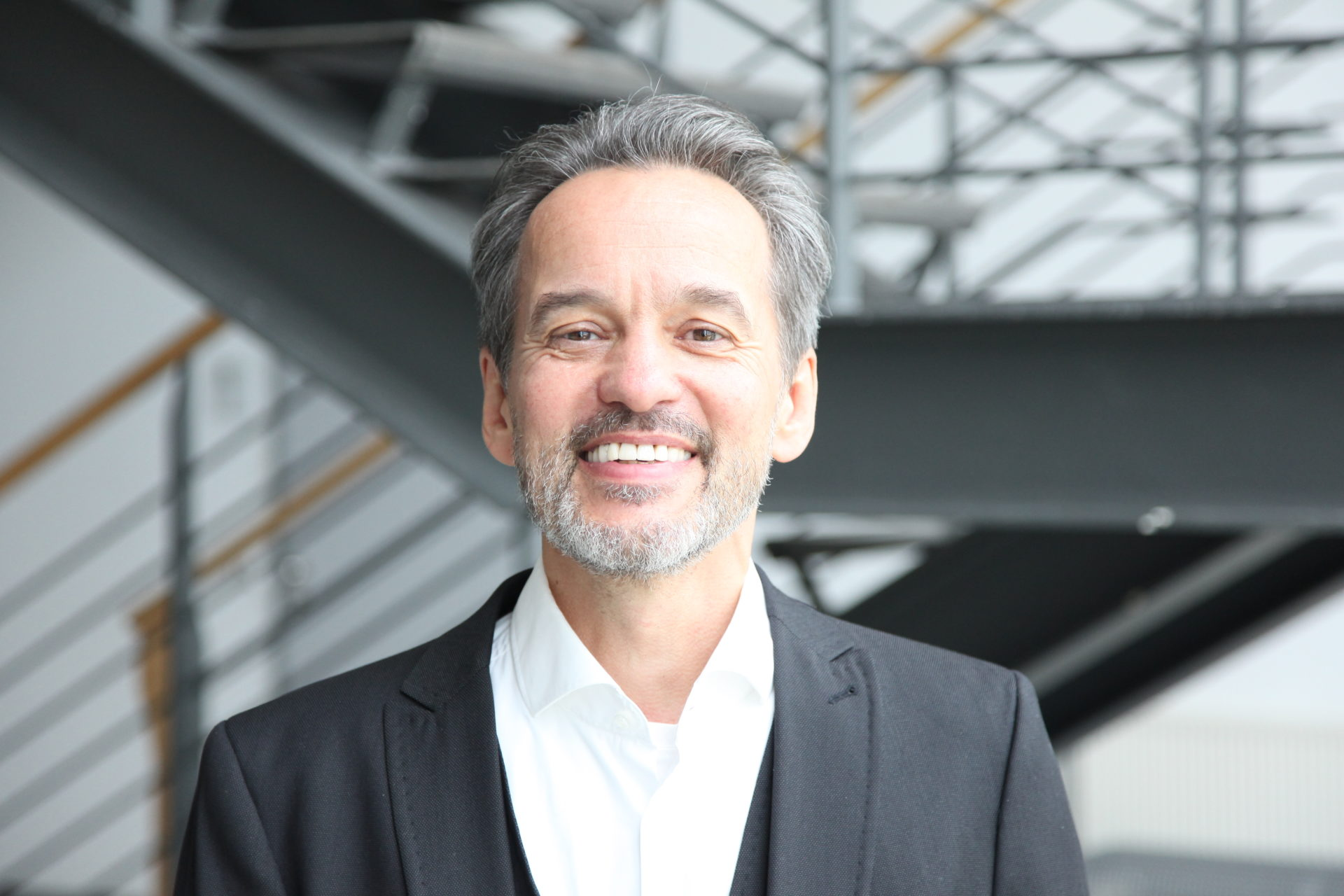
Mike Sandbothe

Mike Sandbothe (born June 26, 1961) is a German intellectual, philosopher and professor of culture and media at University of Applied Sciences Jena.

He is co-founder of the new branch of media philosophy and one of the main proponents of philosophical pragmatism in Europe. He held professorships for Media Culture Studies at Friedrich Schiller University Jena as well as for Media Philosophy at Berlin University of the Arts and at Aalborg University Copenhagen. The certified trainer in Mindfulness-based stress reduction (MBSR) is one of the two founders of the German Network of Mindful Universities "Achtsame Hochschulen". Among his various English publications are The Temporalization of Time (2001; German 1998), The Pragmatic Turn (2004), Pragmatic Media Philosophy (2005; in German: 2001), and From Pragmatist Philosophy to Cultural Politics (2013). His most recent work deals with the topics "Mindful Universities", "Healthy Teaching and Learning", and "Pragmatism as Cultural Politics". Since 2020, he is member of the Erasmus+ Program Training Embodied Critical Thinking.

He lives in Erfurt with his wife and children.

== Publications ==
- Co-ed.: "Richard Rorty. From Pragmatist Philosophy to Cultural Politics", London and New York: Bloomsbury 2013 (hard cover), 2014 (paperback).
- "Pragmatic Media Philosophy. Foundations of a New Discipline in the Internet Age", online publication: sandbothe.net 2005 (German original appeared as "Pragmatische Medienphilosophie. Grundlegung einer neuen Disziplin im Zeitalter des Internet", Weilerswist: Velbrück Wissenschaft 2001).
- Co-ed.: "The Pragmatic Turn in Philosophy. Contemporary Engagements Between Analytic and Continental Thought", New York: SUNY 2004.
- "The Temporalisation of Time. Basic Tendencies in Modern Debate on Time in Philosophy and Science", Lanham and New York: Rowman & Littlefield 2001.
- "Davidson and Rorty on Truth", in: "A House Divided: Comparing Analytic and Continental Philosophers", ed. by Carlos G. Prado, Amherst (N.Y.), Humanities Press, 2003, pp. 235–258; "Review"
- "Media and Knowledge. Some Pragmatist Remarks about Media Philosophy within and beyond the Limits of Epistemology", sandbothe.net 2008; printed version in: Nordicom 4/2008, https://doi.org/10.1515/nor-2017-0180
- "Habermas, Pragmatism, and the Media. An Interview with Mike Sandbothe", sandbothe.net 2008 (German original in: Über Habermas. Gepräche mit Zeitgenossen, ed. by Michael Funken, Darmstadt: Primus 2008)

== Sources ==
- Jan Janzen: "Theories as Tools - Mike Sandbothe's Pragmatist Media Philosophy", sandbothe.net 2007 (German original: "Theorien zu Werkzeugen", in: Medientheorien. Eine philosophische Einführung, hrsg. von Alice Lagaay und David Lauer, Frankfurt a.M.: Campus 2004, pp. 273–295).
- Mats Bergmann: "The New Wave of Pragmatism in Communication Research", in: Nordicom Review 2/2008 (pre-publication in: sandbothe.net 2007).
