= J. B. Schneewind =

American philosopher (1930–2024)

- Schneewind in 1972
- Born: Jerome Borges Schneewind; May 17, 1930; Mount Vernon, New York, U.S.
- Died: January 8, 2024 (aged 93)
- Spouse(s): Edith Levy (div.), Elizabeth Hughes (d. 2021)
- Children: 3 daughters

Academic background
- Education: Cornell University (B.A., 1961); Princeton University (M.A., 1953; Ph.D., 1957)
- Thesis: The Nature of McTaggart's Theory of Appearance
- Doctoral advisor: John W. Yolton
- Other advisor: Max Black

Academic work
- Discipline: Philosopher
- Sub-discipline: Philosophy; Victorian literature; Victorian morality
- Institutions: University of Pittsburgh (1964–1975), Hunter College (1975–1981), Johns Hopkins University (1981–2002)

Jerome Borges Schneewind (May 17, 1930 – January 8, 2024) was an American scholar of the history of philosophy and professor of philosophy at Johns Hopkins University.

== Life and career ==
Jerome Borges Schneewind was born on May 17, 1930, in Mount Vernon, New York.

Schneewind received his B.A. from Cornell University in 1951 and obtained his M.A. (1953) and Ph.D. (1957) from Princeton University.

Schneewind was an Instructor in philosophy at the University of Chicago (1957–1960) and at Princeton University (1960–1961), and he was a faculty member at Yale University (1961–1963), and the University of Pittsburgh (1964–1975). At the latter he also served as Dean of the College of Arts and Sciences (1968–1973). He then taught, and served as provost, at Hunter College CUNY (1975–1981).

Schneewind was appointed at Johns Hopkins University's philosophy department in 1981 as professor of philosophy, retiring in 2002. He was named professor emeritus in 2003.

Schneewind held visiting positions at Leicester, Stanford, and Helsinki. He also held Mellon, Guggenheim, and NEH fellowships, and spent 1992–1993 as a fellow at the Center for Advanced Study in Behavioral Sciences.

Schneewind served as president of the Eastern Division of the American Philosophical Association (1995–1996) and was elected as a member of the American Academy of Arts and Sciences in 1996. He was also Chair of the American Philosophical Association's Board of Officers from 1999 to 2002.

Schneewind died on January 8, 2024, at the age of 93.

== Works ==
Books authored

- Backgrounds of English Victorian Literature, Random House, 1970
- Sidgwick's Ethics and Victorian Moral Philosophy, Oxford University Press, 1977
- The Invention of Autonomy: a history of modern moral philosophy, Cambridge University Press, 1998.
- Essays on the History of Moral Philosophy, Oxford University Press, 2009

Books edited (a selection)

- Giving: Western Ideas of Philanthropy, Bloomington, Indiana University Press, 1996
  - Introduction, and Chapter 3: "Philosophical Ideas of Charity"
- Moral Philosophy from Montaigne to Kant, 2 vols., Cambridge University Press, 1990, 1 vol. reprint, 2002.
- Kant's Lectures on Ethics, Cambridge University Press, 2001, (in The Cambridge Edition of the Works of Immanuel Kant series)

*For more complete publication details see; "J. B. Schneewind: Bibliography" (2009).
