= Therapeutic approach =

Philosophical problems as misconceptions

The therapeutic approach to philosophy sees philosophical problems as misconceptions that are to be therapeutically dissolved. The approach stems from Ludwig Wittgenstein.

There is not a single philosophical method, though there are indeed methods, different therapies, as it were.

— Ludwig Wittgenstein, Philosophical Investigations, §133d

Some noted philosophers who can be said to take a therapeutic approach are John McDowell, Alice Crary, and Richard Rorty. Quietists, philosophers associated with The New Wittgenstein and anti-philosophy are all pertinent to the therapeutic approach.

Hans-Johann Glock has argued against the plausibility of the therapeutic approach as accurately characterizing Wittgenstein's philosophy. Hans Sluga and Rupert Read have advocated a "post-therapeutic" or "liberatory" interpretation of Wittgenstein.

== See also ==
- Existential therapy
- Nonsense § Disguised epistemic nonsense for Wittgenstein's approach to philosophical problems
