= Cora Diamond =

American philosopher

- Born: 1937 (age 88–89); New York City, U.S.

Education
- Education: Swarthmore College (BA); St Hugh's College, Oxford (BPhil)
- Academic advisors: Paul Grice; Mary Warnock

Philosophical work
- Era: Contemporary philosophy
- Region: Western philosophy
- School: Analytic philosophy; postanalytic philosophy
- Institutions: University of Virginia
- Main interests: Moral philosophy; animal ethics; philosophy of language; political philosophy
- Notable ideas: New Wittgenstein

Cora Diamond (born 1937) is an American philosopher who works in the areas of moral philosophy, animal ethics, political philosophy, philosophy of language, philosophy and literature, and the thought of Ludwig Wittgenstein, Gottlob Frege, and Elizabeth Anscombe. Diamond is the Kenan Professor of Philosophy Emerita at the University of Virginia.

== Education and career ==
Diamond received her Bachelor of Arts in mathematics from Swarthmore College in 1957, and her Bachelor of Philosophy degree from St Hugh's College, Oxford in 1961. She began a master's in economics at the Massachusetts Institute of Technology in 1957. However, she never finished it, realising, after attending classes at Harvard taught by Paul Grice and Morton White, that she wanted to pursue philosophy. Before she began the BPhil, she spent a year saving money by working at IBM. At Oxford, for the duration of her BPhil, her tutor was Paul Grice. After the BPhil, she taught at the University of Swansea (1961–62), University of Sussex (1962-1963), and University of Aberdeen (1963-1971). In 1969, she spent a year at the University of Virginia on a visiting appointment. In 1971, she moved to Virginia and taught at the University of Virginia until retiring in 2002. She was elected to the American Academy of Arts and Sciences in 2024.

== Philosophical work ==
One of Diamond's most famous articles, "What Nonsense Might Be", criticizes, on Fregean grounds, the way that the logical positivists think about nonsense. Another well-known article, "Eating Meat and Eating People", examines the rhetorical and philosophical nature of contemporary attitudes towards animal rights. Diamond's writings on Wittgenstein have made her a leading influence in the New Wittgensteinian approach advanced by Alice Crary, James F. Conant, and others.

Diamond has published a collection of essays titled The Realistic Spirit: Wittgenstein, Philosophy, and the Mind. She is the editor of Wittgenstein's Lectures on the Foundations of Mathematics: Cambridge 1939, a collection of lectures assembled from the notes of Wittgenstein's students Norman Malcolm, Rush Rhees, Yorick Smythies, and R. G. Bosanquet.

Wittgenstein and the Moral Life: Essays in Honor of Cora Diamond (edited by Alice Crary) features essays by Crary, John McDowell, Martha Nussbaum, Stanley Cavell, and James F. Conant, among others.

== Selected works ==
- — (1978). "Eating meat and eating people" (PDF). Philosophy. 53 (206): 465–479. doi:10.1017/S0031819100026334. ISSN 0031-8191. JSTOR 3749876.
- — (1981). "What nonsense might be". Philosophy. 56 (215): 5–22. doi:10.1017/S0031819100049743. ISSN 0031-8191. JSTOR 3750713.
- — (1988). "Losing your concepts". Ethics. 98 (2): 255–277. doi:10.1086/292940. ISSN 0014-1704. JSTOR 2381116.
- — (1988). "Throwing away the ladder". Philosophy. 63 (243): 5–27. doi:10.1017/S0031819100043102. ISSN 0031-8191. JSTOR 3750493.
- — (March 1991). "The importance of being human". Royal Institute of Philosophy Supplement. 29: 35–62. doi:10.1017/S135824610000744X. ISSN 1358-2461. EBSCOhost 57117496 ProQuest 2132562109.
- — (2 March 1995). The realistic spirit: Wittgenstein, philosophy, and the mind. Cambridge, Massachusetts: MIT Press. ISBN 978-0-262-54074-2.
- — (June 2000). "Ethics, imagination and the method of Wittgenstein's Tractatus". In Crary, Alice; Read, Rupert J. (eds.). The new Wittgenstein. London: Routledge. doi:10.4324/9780203449400. ISBN 978-0-415-17318-6.
- — (2003). "The difficulty of reality and the difficulty of philosophy" (PDF). Partial Answers: Journal of Literature and the History of Ideas. 1 (2): 1–26. doi:10.1353/pan.0.0090. ISSN 1936-9247.

== See also ==
- American philosophy
