= Terence Horgan =

American philosopher (born 1948)

Terry Horgan
- Born: Terence Edward Horgan; 13 October 1948 (age 78)

Academic background
- Education: Ph.D., Philosophy, University of Michigan, 1974
- Alma mater: Stanford University (BA, 1970); University of Michigan (PhD, 1974)
- Thesis: Microreduction and the Mind-Body Problem (1974)
- Doctoral advisor: Jaegwon Kim

Academic work
- Era: Contemporary philosophy
- Region: Western philosophy
- School or tradition: Analytic
- Institutions: University of Arizona; University of Memphis; University of Michigan
- Main interests: Philosophy of mind Metaethics; Metaphysics; Epistemology; Theory of truth
- Notable ideas: Phenomenal intentionality (PIT); Austere realism / blobjectivism (with Matjaž Potrč); Moral Twin Earth (with Mark Timmons); Transglobal reliabilism (with David K. Henderson); Truth as mediated/indirect correspondence

Terence Edward "Terry" Horgan (born October 13, 1948) is an American philosopher and a professor at the University of Arizona in Tucson. His areas of expertise include philosophy of mind and metaethics.

Horgan obtained his bachelor's degree in philosophy in 1970 from Stanford University. In 1974, he completed his Ph.D. at the University of Michigan under the supervision of Jaegwon Kim, with his dissertation titled "Microreduction and the Mind-Body Problem." After holding professorships in Illinois, Michigan, and Memphis, Horgan has been a professor in Tucson, Arizona since 2002.

== Phenomenal intentionality ==
Horgan has written many works on phenomenal intentionality, which is the idea of "an internal, narrow type of intentionality that is not only determined by phenomenology but is constituted by it". Horgan and his co-authors have been credited with inaugurating the "Phenomenal Intentionality Research Program".

=== Phenomenal intentionality theory (PIT) ===
Horgan and Tienson's position depends upon thought experiments such as brains in vats or deception by an evil demon. Normally our phenomenal experience is dependent upon our sensory modalities and our bodily progress around an environment. However, Horgan and Tienson claim that if you were a brain in a vat, with no sensory or bodily contact with the world, you could have the same phenomenal experiences as if you were really embodied.

— Richard Menary, Encyclopedia of Consciousness entry on Intentionality and Consciousness

Horgan is a leading proponent of the view that intentionality is grounded in phenomenal consciousness, often called the phenomenal intentionality theory (PIT). With John L. Tienson he argued that there exists "a kind of intentionality, pervasive in human mental life, that is constitutively determined by phenomenology alone," articulating the paired theses of the intentionality of phenomenology and the phenomenology of intentionality, and developing a "phenomenal duplicates" argument for the prevalence of phenomenal intentionality. In the same context Horgan and Tienson also contrasted PIT with what they dubbed "separatism," on which consciousness and intentionality are metaphysically independent.

Together with George Graham and Tienson, Horgan developed PIT in a moderate, derivativist direction: many non-phenomenal intentional states (for example, standing beliefs) have their content in virtue of suitable functional or other systematic relations to phenomenal intentional states, rather than being phenomenal themselves. They further defended internalism and a corresponding account of narrow content via "brain-in-a-vat" scenarios, arguing that phenomenal consciousness provides the best basis for narrow intentional content even if reference and truth-conditions involve external relations.

Horgan has also linked PIT to issues of content determinacy, contending (with Graham) that purely physical, functional, or informational facts underdetermine the specific contents we represent (e.g., RABBIT vs. UNDETACHED-RABBIT-PARTS), and that appeal to phenomenal character helps explain how content is fixed. In parallel, he has been a prominent defender of cognitive phenomenology: he connects agentive phenomenology to thought phenomenology, argues for the evidential role of perceptual experience, and maintains that original (non-derived) intentionality is phenomenal intentionality.

Across these contributions, Horgan (often with Tienson and Graham) has used a range of phenomenological devices—contrast cases, spontaneous-thought examples, and agency-involving experiences—to argue that much of a thinker's web of belief and desire is structured by, or derives from, phenomenal character.

=== Moral phenomenology ===
Horgan has applied his phenomenological theories in investigating moral issues (moral phenomenology), such as formulating a theory of the supererogatory.

=== Narrow mental content ===
Horgan's view offers a potential reconciliation with some of the opponents of the content views. The phenomenal intentionality thesis takes the agent to be a central source of intentionality and offers an explanation of how this agent-centered intentionality may be a source of both perceptual content and thought content. The main objection from the Travis camp to this sort of approach probably wouldn't be that it construes representation independently of the agent who is doing the representing but rather that it treats phenomenology as representational independently of any higher-order epistemic states.

— Berit Brogaard, Does Perception Have Content?

Horgan has been a central proponent of linking phenomenal intentionality to narrow mental content. With John Tienson (and later with George Graham), he argues that there is a pervasive kind of intentionality that is constitutively fixed by phenomenology alone, and that phenomenology itself depends only on an individual's intrinsic (narrow) properties. Taken together, these claims support the existence of widespread narrow content: if phenomenal character is narrow and phenomenal character determines intentional content, then much intentional content is narrow as well.

To motivate both premises, Horgan, Tienson, and Graham adapt brain-in-a-vat scenarios: a physical duplicate of a subject's brain, sustained and stimulated so as to match the subject's internal states, would (they contend) share the subject's phenomenology; because phenomenal character fixes phenomenal intentional content, many of the duplicate's intentional contents would match the original's too. This is intended to show both the narrowness of phenomenology and the reality of phenomenally determined (hence narrow) content.

Although perceptual experience is the most immediate case, Horgan and collaborators extend the program beyond perception, arguing for distinctive phenomenologies of agency and of propositional attitudes (belief, desire), and for the thesis that all intentionality is either identical with, or derived from, phenomenal intentionality—thereby grounding a broad class of narrow contents for thought as well.

On the theoretical side, Horgan and Tienson suggest affinities between their approach and two-dimensional modal semantics for characterizing content, while related work with Uriah Kriegel emphasizes a broadly descriptive connection between phenomenal intentionality and reference.

== General ontology ==
Among contemporary philosophers, Horgan and Potrč are probably the leading, and perhaps the only, existence monists.

— Jonathan Schaffer, Stanford Encyclopedia of Philosophy entry on Monism

In metaphysics, Horgan defends austere realism, an ontological position developed with Matjaž Potrč. Austere realism combines a minimalist ontology with a contextual theory of truth. The ontology is "austere," excluding most common-sense objects, yet ordinary statements about such entities can still be true via semantic correctness under contextual standards.

In Austere Realism: Contextual Semantics Meets Minimal Ontology (2008), Horgan and Potrč defended a version called blobjectivism: the view that only one concrete particular exists—the entire cosmos ("the blobject"). Thus, Horgan and Potrč's view is a form of "Existence Monism". This entity has enormous spatiotemporal variability but no proper parts. Truth, on their account, is a matter of indirect correspondence rather than mirroring discrete objects. This view has been discussed in metametaphysical debates.

== Philosophy of mind ==
In the philosophy of mind, Horgan has investigated the possibility of a physicalist interpretation of consciousness.

=== Views on the knowledge argument about qualia ===
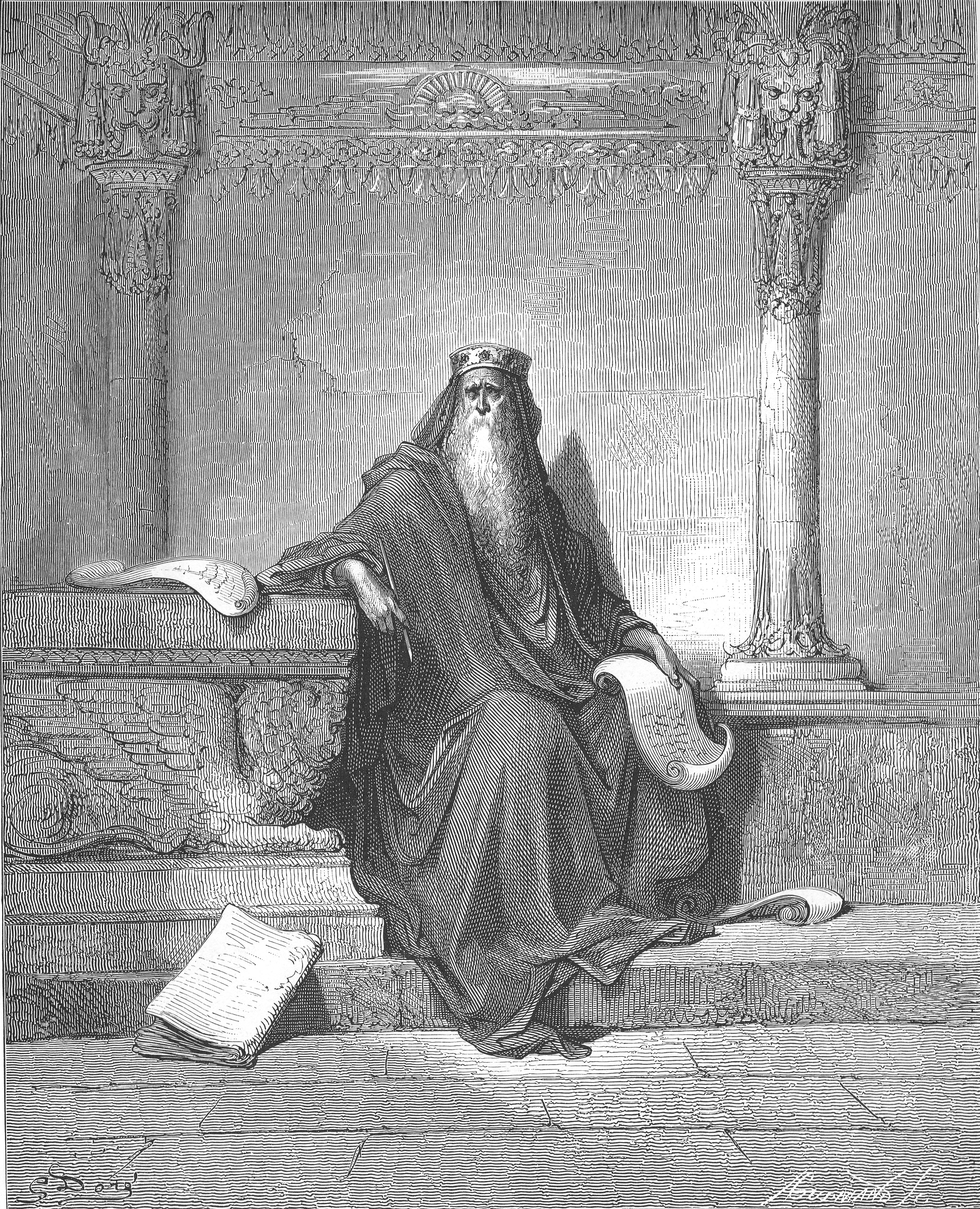
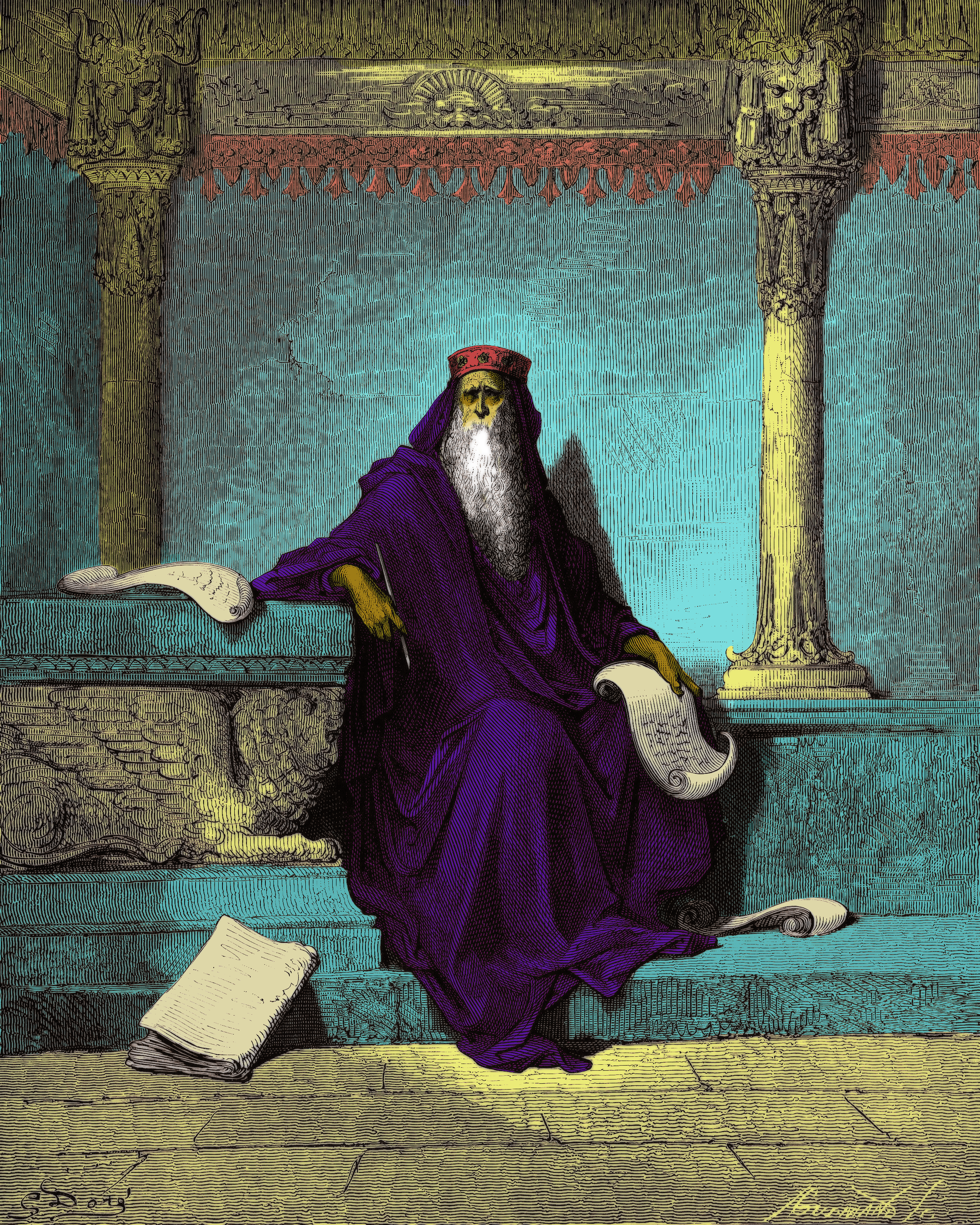
In Frank Jackson's thought experiment, a scientist named Mary exists in a black-and-white world where she has extensive access to physical descriptions of color, but no actual perceptual experience of color. Mary has learned everything there is to learn about color, but she has never actually experienced it for herself. The central question of the thought experiment is whether Mary will gain new knowledge when she goes outside of the colorless world and experiences seeing in color.

In a 1984 paper, Horgan criticized Frank Cameron Jackson's dualistic thought experiment known as "Mary's Room" as merely exploiting an ambiguity in the notion of physical information, rendering it inconclusive since "physical information" carries different meanings in various premises. Since 2002, Horgan has begun arguing against it using conceivability arguments in the tradition of Saul Kripke and David Chalmers.

=== Views on reductionism and multiple realizability ===
In a 1993 paper, Horgan raised methodological caveats about reductionism regarding mind, resting ultimately on multiple realizability. He wrote:

Multiple realizability might well begin at home. For all we now know (and I emphasize that we really do not now know), the intentional mental states we attribute to one another might turn out to be radically multiply realizable at the neurobiological level of description, even in humans; indeed, even in individual humans; indeed, even in an individual human given the structure of his central nervous system at a single moment of his life. (p. 308; author's emphases)

=== Views on supervenience ===
Regarding the supervenience of the mental on the physical, Horgan has promoted the notion of "superdupervenience" (a term coined by William Lycan) as well as his own formulations of what he called "regional supervenience".

In an essay from 2002, Horgan describes his ambivalent stance towards physicalism as follows: "I remain deeply attracted to materialism in philosophy of mind; I would like to believe that the mental is superdupervenient on the physical. But the whole hard problem looks very hard indeed, and I see no prospects currently in sight for dealing with it satisfactorily. […] Much as I would like to be a materialist, at present I do not know what an adequate materialist theory of mind would look like."

== Metaethics and moral philosophy ==
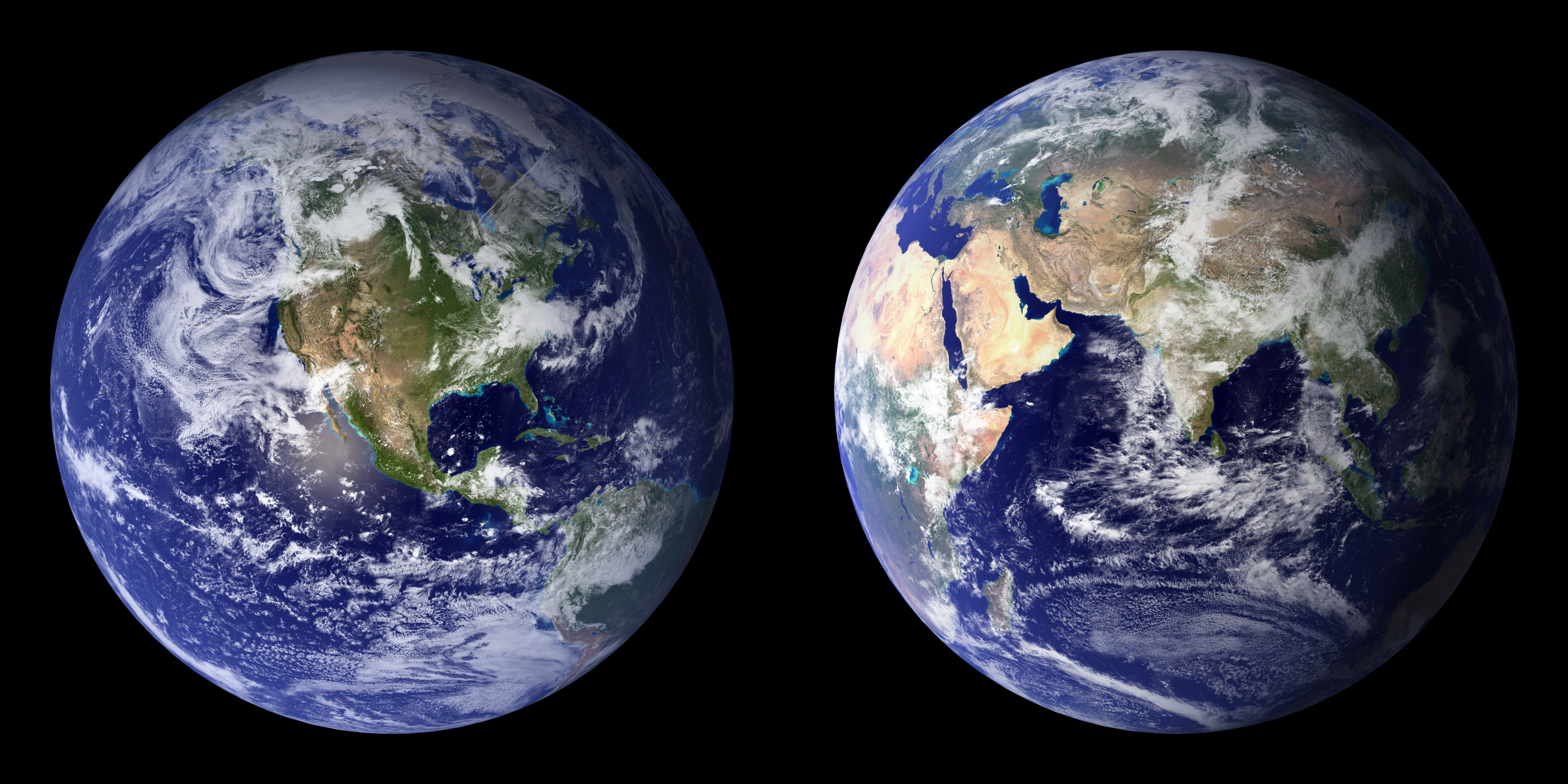
The Twin Earth thought experiment posits a second Earth which is identical in all ways except one. Horgan and Timmons proposed a moral version.

Horgan, with Mark Timmons, developed the Moral Twin Earth argument. In New Wave Moral Realism Meets Moral Twin Earth (1991), they adapted Putnam's Twin Earth thought experiment to moral terms. They showed that if moral terms could pick out different properties on a twin Earth, then synthetic moral naturalism faces serious problems. This thought experiment has been called the "central difficulty" against an objection against Moore's "open question argument" against moral naturalism.

Horgan's approach to supervenience of moral truths on natural truths, relying on "superdupervenience", has been influential.

In subsequent work, Horgan and Timmons defended cognitivist expressivism (also called nondescriptivist cognitivism). This hybrid theory holds that moral judgments are cognitive states (beliefs) but not descriptive representations of stance-independent facts. Rather, they express evaluative attitudes while still being truth-apt under minimalist semantics. This approach explains the objectivity-like feel of moral discourse without positing robust moral facts.

== Decision theory ==
Newcomb's problem is a decision problem where you face two boxes: Box A (transparent) contains $1,000 and Box B (opaque) contains either $1,000,000 or $0. A highly reliable predictor has already predicted whether you will take only Box B or both boxes; if it predicted you'll take only B, it put $1,000,000 in B, otherwise B is empty. The puzzle is the conflict between the dominance argument (take both boxes to always gain an extra $1,000) and the expected-utility argument (one-boxing will probably yield the $1,000,000 given the predictor's accuracy).

Regarding Newcomb's problem, Horgan supports one-boxing, but believes that this cannot be demonstrated to be the only rational solution to the problem, because it is a "deep antinomy of practical reason" where both solutions are supported by principles that are constitutive of practical rationality.

== Epistemology ==
Horgan is critical of Bayesian formal epistemology, saying that "there is no such psychological state as the agent's credence in $p$" and that Bayesian epistemology is "like alchemy and phlogiston theory: it is not about any real phenomena, and thus it also is not about any genuine norms that govern real phenomena".

Together with David Henderson, Horgan has proposed an epistemology called "transglobal reliabilism", which proposes that a belief is justified only if the process that produced it is robustly reliable across a broad set of worlds that are experientially like ours (so it would still work under many variations). This view has been criticized for illegitimately assuming that there are more truth-friendly such worlds than deceptive ones, as well as for proposing an unnecessary requirement for justification. Henderson and Horgan have also proposed a modified version, called "transglobal evidentialism-reliabilism", together with Matjaž Potrč.

== Theory of truth ==
Horgan has developed, often with Robert Barnard and Matjaž Potrč, a non-deflationary correspondence account on which truth is always a matter of correspondence with reality, but the correspondence can be either direct or indirect/mediated. On this view, the truth of a statement is its semantic correctness under the contextually operative standards that connect language and thought to the world; different discourses can therefore realize truth via different, sometimes indirect, ways of corresponding to facts.

The indirect-correspondence component is tied to Horgan and Potrč's "contextual semantics" and their austere realism, which seeks a minimal ontology while preserving the abundant truth of ordinary and scientific discourse. On this picture, many everyday claims can be literally true even if the ontology denies the corresponding entities as fundamental, because their truth is a matter of mediated correspondence given ordinary semantic standards.

Horgan and Barnard describe their position as a form of correspondence pluralism: truth always consists in correspondence, but there are different forms of correspondence across domains. They argue that this preserves a robust, unified notion of truth while allowing variation in how truth is realized (for example, via indirect semantic standards in some areas). Secondary overviews classify Horgan's view alongside pluralist theories that maintain correspondence while allowing different ways of corresponding; the Stanford Encyclopedia of Philosophy explicitly cites Horgan and collaborators in presenting this family of positions.

Reception and discussion emphasize both the robustness and the indirect character of Horgan's correspondence account. Michael P. Lynch analyzes Horgan's "contextual semantics" and labels the overall view "Indirect Correspondence Metaphysical Realism," highlighting its commitment to realism combined with mediated standards for truth. A review of Truth and Pluralism: Current Debates likewise characterizes Barnard & Horgan's contribution as defending a view on which truth is always correspondence but "rarely" direct.

== Works ==
This is a list of works by Terence Horgan.

=== Books (authored/co-authored) ===
- Essays on Paradoxes (Oxford University Press, 2016)
- The Epistemological Spectrum (with David Henderson; Oxford University Press, 2011)
- Austere Realism: Contextual Semantics Meets Minimal Ontology (with Matjaž Potrč; MIT Press, 2008)
- Connectionism and the Philosophy of Psychology (with John Tienson; MIT Press, 1996)

=== Selected major papers ===
==== Supervenience, physicalism, and mind ====
- "From Supervenience to Superdupervenience: Meeting the Demands of a Material World," Mind 102 (1993): 555–586
- "Supervenience and Microphysics," Pacific Philosophical Quarterly 63 (1982): 29–43
- "Mental Quausation," Philosophical Perspectives 3 (1989): 47–76

==== Philosophy of language and semantics ====
- "Attitudinatives," Linguistics and Philosophy 12 (1989): 133–165

==== Metaethics (Moral Twin Earth and related) ====
- (with Mark Timmons) "New Wave Moral Realism Meets Moral Twin Earth," Journal of Philosophical Research 16 (1991): 447–465
- (with Mark Timmons) "Troubles for New Wave Moral Semantics: The ‘Open Question Argument’ Revived," Philosophical Papers 21 (1992): 153–175
- (with Mark Timmons) "Troubles on Moral Twin Earth: Moral Queerness Revived," Synthese 92 (1992): 221–260
- "Copping Out on Moral Twin Earth," Synthese 124 (2000): 139–152

==== Phenomenology and intentionality ====
- (with John Tienson) "The Intentionality of Phenomenology and the Phenomenology of Intentionality," in D. J. Chalmers (ed.), Philosophy of Mind: Classical and Contemporary Readings (2002), 520–533
- "Original Intentionality is Phenomenal Intentionality," The Monist 96 (2013): 232–251
- (with Uriah Kriegel) "Phenomenal Intentionality Meets the Extended Mind," The Monist 91 (2008): 347–373

==== Vagueness and sorites ====
- "Facing Up to the Sorites Paradox," Proceedings of the 20th World Congress of Philosophy 6 (2000): 99–111
- "Transvaluationism about Vagueness: A Progress Report," Southern Journal of Philosophy 48 (2010): 1–33

==== Decision theory and paradoxes ====
- (with Anna Mahtani) "Generalized Conditionalization and the Sleeping Beauty Problem," Erkenntnis 78 (2013): 333–351
- "Generalized Conditionalization and the Sleeping Beauty Problem, II," Erkenntnis 80 (2015): 811–839
- "Newcomb’s Problem Revisited," Harvard Review of Philosophy 22 (2015): 4–15

==== Philosophy of science and mathematics ====
- "Science Nominalized," Philosophy of Science 51 (1984): 529–549
- "Science Nominalized Properly," Philosophy of Science 54 (1987): 281–282

==== Knowledge argument / qualia ====
- "Jackson on Physical Information and Qualia," The Philosophical Quarterly 34 (1984): 147–152
