= Willem deVries =

American philosopher, 1950-

- Born: Willem Anton deVries; 1950 (age 75–76)

Academic background
- Education: Haverford College (A.B.); University of Pittsburgh (M.A., PhD)
- Thesis: Hegel's Theory of Mental Activity (1981)
- Doctoral advisor: Wilfrid Sellars

Academic work
- Era: Contemporary philosophy
- Region: Western philosophy
- School or tradition: Analytic philosophy Pittsburgh school
- Institutions: University of New Hampshire

Willem Anton deVries (born 1950) is an American philosopher and distinguished professor emeritus of philosophy at the University of New Hampshire. Along with John McDowell and Robert Brandom, deVries is part of the analytic Hegelian movement strongly influenced by the work of his doctoral advisor, Wilfrid Sellars.

== Education and career ==
deVries received his B.A. from Haverford College in 1972 and his M.A. from the University of Pittsburgh in 1975. After studying at the Hegel Archive of the Ruhr University Bochum for a year, he obtained his PhD from Pittsburgh under Wilfrid Sellars in 1981.

In 1988, deVries joined the University of New Hampshire as a professor of philosophy, and also published his PhD dissertation as the book Hegel's Theory of Mental Activity, which was reviewed by Karl Ameriks, Richard E. Aquila, Robert Stern, and Michael George.

He has since published two books on Wilfrid Sellars, Knowledge, Mind, and the Given: Reading Wilfrid Sellars's "Empiricism and the Philosophy of Mind" (2000) and Wilfrid Sellars (2005), and edited the volumes Empiricism, Perceptual Knowledge, Normativity, and Realism: Essays on Wilfrid Sellars (2009) and Sellars and Davidson in Dialogue: Truths, Meanings, and Minds (2025).
