= Danielle Macbeth =

Canadian philosopher (born 1954)

Danielle Monique Macbeth (born 1954, Edmonton) is a Canadian philosopher whose work focuses on the philosophy of mathematics, the philosophy of language, metaphysics, and the philosophy of logic. She is T. Wistar Brown Professor of Philosophy at Haverford College in Pennsylvania where she has taught since 1989. Macbeth also taught at the University of Hawaii from 1986–1989.

== Education and career ==
Macbeth received a Bachelor of Science degree in Biochemistry at the University of Alberta in 1977 before beginning her philosophical studies. She then went on to receive a Bachelor of Arts degree in Philosophy and Religious Studies at McGill University in Montreal in 1980 and received her PhD from University of Pittsburgh in 1988. She wrote her dissertation under John Haugeland, and studied also with Wilfrid Sellars, John McDowell, and Robert Brandom. Macbeth has received numerous awards and fellowships including NEH Grants, and an ACLS Frederick Burkhardt Residential Fellowship. In 2002-2003, she was a Fellow at the Center for Advanced Study in Behavioral Sciences in Palo Alto, California.

Macbeth is the author of two books, Frege’s Logic (2005) and Realizing Reason: A Narrative of Truth and Knowing (2014).

== Philosophical work ==
=== Frege's Logic ===
In Frege's Logic (2005), Macbeth proposes a new reading of Frege’s notation and logical project. Rather than treating Begriffsschrift (Frege's logic) as a notational variant of quantificational logic, Macbeth proposes that reasoning in Begriffsschrift is more like the diagrammatic reasoning of the geometrician or algebraist. She argues that philosophers and mathematicians alike have failed to recognize the revolutionary powers of Begriffsschrift in its expressive and demonstrative capacities.

=== Realizing Reason ===
Realizing Reason, her most recent book, takes a Hegelian approach to the philosophy of mathematics and traces developments in philosophy, logic, mathematics, and physics beginning with Aristotle in order to illuminate how (pure) reason has come to be realized as a power of knowing. She focuses on three periods: Ancient Greece, early modern mathematics, physics, and philosophy (Descartes to Kant), and late nineteenth-century and early twentieth-century mathematics and physics. Macbeth argues that with her new reading of Frege, we can finally break out of the Kantian framework that remains in place even in twentieth-century analytic philosophy and thereby finally understand how contemporary mathematics enables real extensions of our knowledge on the basis of strictly deductive reasoning. Thus, she demonstrates how pure reason has finally been realized as a power of knowing.

Macbeth has also published many articles on a wide range of topics in the history and philosophy of mathematics, the philosophy of language, the philosophy of mind, and pragmatism.

== Books ==
- Frege’s Logic (Cambridge, Mass.: Harvard University Press, 2005) ISBN 978-0674017078
- Realizing Reason: A Narrative of Truth and Knowing (Oxford: Oxford University Press, 2014) ISBN 978-0198704751
