= John Haugeland =

American philosopher

- Born: John Christian Haugeland II; March 13, 1945; Harrisburg, Illinois, U.S.
- Died: June 23, 2010 (aged 65); Chicago, Illinois, U.S.

Education
- Education: Harvey Mudd College; University of California, Berkeley
- Thesis: Truth and Understanding (1976)
- Doctoral advisor: Hans Sluga

Philosophical work
- Era: Contemporary philosophy
- Region: Western philosophy
- School: Analytic philosophy Pittsburgh school Phenomenology
- Institutions: University of Pittsburgh; University of Chicago
- Doctoral students: Arthur Ripstein
- Main interests: Philosophy of mind; Cognitive science; Heidegger
- Notable ideas: Objectivity as dependent on commitment

John Christian Haugeland II (/ˈhɔːɡlənd/ HAWG-lənd; March 13, 1945 – June 23, 2010) was an American philosopher, specializing in the philosophy of mind, cognitive science, phenomenology, and Heidegger. He spent most of his career at the University of Pittsburgh, followed by the University of Chicago from 1999 until his death. He is featured in Tao Ruspoli's film Being in the World.

== Education and career ==
Haugeland studied at Harvey Mudd College, where he obtained a B.S., cum laude, in physics in 1966. He received a Ph.D. in philosophy at the University of California, Berkeley, completing his dissertation, entitled Truth and Understanding, under the supervision of Hans Sluga in 1976. At Berkeley, Hubert Dreyfus served as one of his important mentors, becoming almost a de facto doctoral advisor.

Haugeland spent most of his career teaching at the University of Pittsburgh, from 1974 until 1999, and he also served as a visiting professor at Helsinki University, Finland. He served as chair of the philosophy department at the University of Chicago from 2004 to 2007.

Haugeland was a research fellow of the National Endowment for the Humanities and of the Center for Advanced Study in the Behavioral Sciences. He had also been a member of the Council for Philosophical Studies. Before attending graduate school Haugeland served as a Peace Corps volunteer in Tonga.

== Philosophical work ==
In Artificial Intelligence: The Very Idea, Haugeland coined the term GOFAI ("Good Old-Fashioned Artificial Intelligence") for symbolic artificial intelligence.

In Having Thought, he gathered together some of his most influential papers, thirteen, ordered both chronologically and also thematically, under a number of subject headings, namely mind, matter, meaning and truth. Subject heading mind elaborates about cognitive science, with a couple of papers, and about Hume with a third one. Subject heading matter addresses, through three papers, the relation between the intelligibility of mind and the material or physical. Meaning musters diverse papers all about the relationship between us and the world and, finally, truth deals, by means of four papers, with objectivity in terms of constitution as dependent on commitment.

Philosophers who completed their doctoral dissertations under John Haugeland's supervision include Danielle Macbeth, Tim van Gelder, Quill Kukla, and Zed Adams.

== Books ==
- Mind Design (1981) (editor). Cambridge, Massachusetts: MIT Press
- Artificial Intelligence: The Very Idea (1985). Cambridge, Massachusetts: MIT Press. ISBN 0-262-08153-9
- Mind Design II: Philosophy, Psychology, Artificial Intelligence. Second Edition (1997) (editor). Cambridge, Massachusetts: MIT Press ISBN 0-262-08259-4
- Having Thought: Essays in the Metaphysics of Mind (1998). Cambridge, Massachusetts: Harvard University Press. ISBN 978-0-674-00415-3
- Thomas S. Kuhn, The Road Since Structure: Philosophical Essays, 1970-1993 (2000) (Haugeland, J. and Conant, J., eds.). Chicago, Ill.: University of Chicago Press.
- Dasein Disclosed: John Haugeland's Heidegger (2013) (Joseph Rouse, editor). Cambridge, Massachusetts: Harvard University Press. ISBN 978-0-674-07211-4
- Giving a Damn: Essays in Dialogue with John Haugeland (2017) (Zed Adams and Jacob Browning, editors). Cambridge, Massachusetts: MIT Press. ISBN 978-0-262-03524-8

== See also ==
- American philosophy
- List of American philosophers
