= James F. Conant =

American philosopher (born 1958)

- Born: James Ferguson Conant; June 10, 1958 (age 68); Kyoto, Japan

Education
- Education: Harvard University (BA, PhD)
- Thesis: Three Philosophers: Kierkegaard, Nietzsche and James (1991)
- Doctoral advisor: Stanley Cavell, Hilary Putnam
- Other advisor: Burton Dreben

Philosophical work
- Era: Contemporary philosophy
- Region: Western philosophy
- School: Analytic, postanalytic
- Institutions: University of Chicago
- Notable students: Matthew Boyle
- Main interests: Wittgenstein, German idealism, philosophy of language, ethics, metaphilosophy

James Ferguson Conant (/ˈkoʊnənt/; born June 10, 1958) is an American philosopher at the University of Chicago who has written extensively on topics in philosophy of language, ethics, and metaphilosophy. He is the Chester D. Tripp Distinguished Service Professor of Humanities at the University of Chicago. He is perhaps best known for his writings on the history of German philosophy and the history of analytic philosophy. These two interests overlap in his work on Ludwig Wittgenstein. Earlier in his career, he was known for his association with the New Wittgenstein school of Wittgenstein interpretation initiated by Cora Diamond. He has also written on Immanuel Kant and the Kantian tradition in both German and analytic philosophy.

== Life and career ==
Conant was born in Kyoto, Japan, to American parents. He is the grandson of former Harvard University president James Bryant Conant. At 14, he attended Phillips Exeter Academy. He received his B.A. in Philosophy and History of Science from Harvard College in 1982, and his Ph.D. in Philosophy from Harvard University in 1990.

He joined the philosophy faculty at the University of Pittsburgh from 1990–1999, and then became Professor of Philosophy at the University of Chicago. In December 2012, he became co-director of the Center for Analytic German Idealism at Leipzig University, and in July, 2017 he was appointed Humboldt Professor of Philosophy at Leipzig University. He resigned the Humboldt Professorship effective July 1, 2023, and returned full-time to University of Chicago, where he remains Chester D. Tripp Distinguished Service Professor of Humanities. He remains as an adjunct professor at Leipzig and has held visiting professorships and fellowships at numerous institutions worldwide.

== Philosophical work ==
Since the mid 1990s Conant, together with Cora Diamond has advanced a “resolute reading” of Wittgenstein's early work which seeks to expose neglected underlying continuities between the philosopher's early and later approaches to philosophy, especially between his early Tractatus Logico-Philosophicus and his later Philosophical Investigations. Conant has contributed to other areas in the history of analytic philosophy, writing particularly about the work of Gottlob Frege, of Rudolf Carnap, as well as about the relation between the views of both of these figures and those of Wittgenstein. A related theme running throughout Conant's work is the relation between the ideas of Immanuel Kant, and the post-Kantian German tradition more broadly, and the anglophone analytic tradition.

A recurring topic throughout Conant’s work is also that of philosophical skepticism. In this connection, he has drawn a distinction between two varieties of skepticism, which he calls “Cartesian skepticism” and “Kantian skepticism” respectively. He has also published detailed readings of Kant’s Transcendental Deduction of the Categories of the Understanding and a critique of what he terms the “layer-cake conception of human mindedness.”

In 2020, Harvard University Press published the 1100-page volume The Logical Alien: Conant and His Critics, edited by Sofia Miguens. The volume gathers Conant’s 1991 article The Search for Logically Alien Thought with reflections on it by eight philosophers: Jocelyn Benoist, Matthew Boyle, Martin Gustafsson, Arata Hamawaki, Adrian Moore, Barry Stroud, Peter Sullivan, and Charles Travis, followed by Conant’s responses to them.

His Norton anthology, co-edited with Jay Elliott, on The Analytic Tradition is used in introductory and advanced courses on the history of analytic philosophy.

Conant is also known for his work on philosophical aesthetics, which builds on that of the American philosopher Stanley Cavell, with articles on Shakespeare, Kafka, Orwell, and on film aesthetics.

== Awards ==
In 2016, Conant was one of three academics from abroad selected to receive Germany’s top international research award, the Alexander von Humboldt Professorship Research Prize.

In 2012 Conant received the Humboldt Foundation Anneliese Maier Research Award, a five-year award to promote the internationalisation of the humanities and social sciences in Germany.
In summer 2011, the Institute of Philosophy of the University of Porto in Portugal hosted a conference titled The Logical Alien at 20, dedicated to the 20th anniversary of the publication of James Conant's paper "The Search for Logically Alien Thought".

Conant has received several academic distinctions, including the Alexander von Humboldt Professorship (2017–2022) from the Alexander von Humboldt Foundation. Other honors include the Neubauer Faculty Project on The Idealism Project (2015–2017), the Lichtenberg-Kolleg Fellowship (2012–2013), and the George Plimpton Adams Prize for Outstanding Dissertation (1990).

== Professional service ==
Conant is Director of the Chicago Center for German Philosophy at the University of Chicago and Co-Director (with Andrea Kern) of the Forschungskolleg Analytic German Idealism (FAGI) at the University of Leipzig (since 2012). He serves on the editorial boards of Wittgenstein-Studien (De Gruyter, Berlin) and Iride (il Mulino, Firenze). He is Co-Chair of the International Wittgenstein Society and Workshop Coordinator of the Wittgenstein Workshop at the University of Chicago. He has co-organized numerous of international conferences and workshops and has served as a referee for major university presses. He is a co-member of international research projects funded by the Norwegian Research Council and the Inter-Nordic Research Council. He has also served as University of Chicago Faculty Senate Representative and on the Board of Directors of the International Ludwig Wittgenstein Society.

== Bibliography ==
- “Editors’ Introduction” to Early Analytic Philosophy: Origins and Transformations, edited by James Conant & Gilad Nir, Routledge, 2025.
- An Introduction to Practical Philosophy: Historical and Systematic Perspectives”, in Practical Philosophy: Historical and Systematic Perspectives, edited by James Conant and Dawa Ometto, De Gruyter, summer 2023.
- “An Introduction to Reading Rödl on Self-Consciousness and Objectivity”, in Reading Rödl on Self-Consciousness and Objectivity, edited by James Conant and Jesse Mulder, Routledge, summer 2023.
- “An Introduction to Hilary Putnam”, in Engaging the Philosophy of Hilary Putnam, edited by James Conant and Sanjit Chakraborty, De Gruyter, summer 2022.
- “Resolute Disjunctivism”, in Essays in Honor of John McDowell, ed. by Matthew Boyle and Evgenia Mylonaki, Harvard University Press, summer 2022.
- “Cinematic Invisibility: The Shower Scene in Hitchcock’s Psycho”, in Philosophy of Film Without Theory, summer 2022.
- “Some Socratic Aspects of Wittgenstein’s Conception of Philosophy”, in: Wittgenstein on Philosophy, Objectivity, and Meaning, ed. by J. Conant & S. Sunday: Cambridge University Press, 2019 pp. 231–264.
- “Die Dialektik von Natur und Kultur beim späten Nietzsche” in James Conant, Friedrich Nietzsche: Perfektionismus & Perspektivismus tr. by Joachim Schulte, Konstanz University Press, 2014.
- The Norton Anthology of Western Philosophy: After Kant, WW Norton & Co, 2017.
- The Logical Alien: Conant and his Critics, Harvard University Press, 2020.

== See also ==
- American philosophy
- List of American philosophers
