= Pittsburgh school =

Late 20th and 21st century philosophical movement

The Pittsburgh School sometimes described as analytic Hegelianism or Pittsburgh Hegelianism, is a philosophical movement mostly associated with the works of key philosophers such as Wilfrid Sellars, John McDowell and Robert Brandom, at the University of Pittsburgh's department of philosophy, who developed a distinctive approach within analytic philosophy during the late 20th and early 21st centuries.

== History ==
Wilfrid Sellars viewed his work as moving analytic philosophy from its Humean (i.e. logical positivist) to its Kantian phase, and Richard Rorty suggested that Brandom's work continues that movement into its Hegelian phase. Especially Brandom's Hegelian variety of the Pittsburgh school, is often described as "analytic Hegelianism". In the words of the Pittsburgh philosopher Willem deVries:

"Analytic philosophy is rediscovering Hegel. [There is] a particularly strong thread of new analytic Hegelianism, sometimes called 'Pittsburgh Hegelianism' ... The sociality and historicity of reason, the proper treatment of space and time, conceptual holism, inferentialism, the reality of conceptual structure, the structure of experience, and the nature of normativity are the central concerns of Pittsburgh Hegelianism."

== Themes ==
Even though not primarily an ethical movement, but broadly put it attempts to reconcile scientific realism with robust accounts of normativity, social articulation of reasons and meaning, intelligible within the "space of reasons" as opposed to the "space of causes". The movement therefore can be understood as a neopragmatist and post-empiricist movement.

== Figures ==
- Nuel Belnap
- Matthew Boyle
- Robert Brandom
- Willem deVries
- John Haugeland
- John McDowell
- Wilfrid Sellars
- Michael Thompson

== See also ==
- Center for Philosophy of Science

== Sources ==
- Levine, Steven. Hegel and the Pittsburgh School. Elements in the Philosophy of Georg Wilhelm Friedrich Hegel. Cambridge University Press. doi:10.1017/9781009559546.
- Hedrick, Lisa Landoe (2021). Whitehead and the Pittsburgh School: Preempting the Problem of Intentionality (1 ed.). Lexington Books. doi:10.5040/9781978737594. ISBN 978-1-9787-3759-4.
- Maher, Chauncey (2012-08-21). The Pittsburgh School of Philosophy: Sellars, McDowell, Brandom (0 ed.). Routledge. doi:10.4324/9780203097502. ISBN 978-0-203-09750-2.
- Redding, Paul (2007). Analytic Philosophy and the Return of Hegelian Thought. Modern European Philosophy. Cambridge: Cambridge University Press. doi:10.1017/CBO9780511487620. ISBN 978-0-521-87272-0.
