= Michael Thompson (philosopher) =

American philosopher

- Born: Michael John Thompson; 1959 (age 66–67)

Education
- Education: University of California, Los Angeles (PhD)
- Thesis: Some Remarks on the Role of Generality in Practice (1992)
- Doctoral advisor: David Dolinko

Philosophical work
- Era: Contemporary philosophy
- Region: Western philosophy
- School: Analytic philosophy Pittsburgh school
- Institutions: University of Pittsburgh
- Notable students: Matthew Boyle
- Main interests: Philosophy of action, ethics

Michael John Thompson (born 1959) is an American philosopher at the University of Pittsburgh.

== Life and work ==
Thompson's 2009 book Life and Action has been the subject of multiple reviews, including the Graduate Faculty Philosophy Journal's roundtable by Jay Bernstein, Alice Crary, and Zed Adams. The work has also been translated by Matthias Haase into German, Guido Seddone to Italian (including a preface), and Chen Chumiao into Chinese.

== Selected publications ==
- Thompson, Michael (2009-07-01). Life and Action: Elementary Structures of Practice and Practical Thought. Harvard University Press. doi:10.4159/9780674033962. ISBN 978-0-674-03396-2.
