= The New Wittgenstein =

2000 book, eds. Alice Crary & Rupert Read

- Editors: Alice Crary; Rupert Read
- Language: English
- Published: 2000
- Publisher: Blackwell
- Publication place: United Kingdom
- ISBN: 978-0-415-17319-3

The New Wittgenstein (2000) is a book containing interpretations of the work of philosopher Ludwig Wittgenstein. Those associated with these interpretations, such as Cora Diamond, Alice Crary, and James F. Conant, understand Wittgenstein to have avoided putting forth a "positive" metaphysical program and understand him to be advocating philosophy as a form of "therapy." Under these interpretations, Wittgenstein's program is dominated by the idea that philosophical problems are symptoms of illusions or "bewitchments by language," and that attempts at a "narrow" solution to philosophical problems, one that does not take into account larger questions of how the questioner conducts their life, interacts with other people, and uses language generally, are doomed to failure.

== Overview ==
According to the introduction to the anthology The New Wittgenstein (ISBN 0-415-17319-1):

Wittgenstein's primary aim in philosophy is – to use a word he himself employs in characterizing his later philosophical procedures – a therapeutic one. These papers have in common an understanding of Wittgenstein as aspiring, not to advance metaphysical theories, but rather to help us work ourselves out of confusions we become entangled in when philosophizing.

While many philosophers have suggested variants of such ideas in readings of the work of later Wittgenstein, namely the author of Philosophical Investigations, a notable aspect of the New Wittgenstein interpretation is a view that the work of early Wittgenstein, exemplified by the Tractatus Logico-Philosophicus, and the Investigations, are actually more deeply connected, and in less opposition, to each other than usually understood. This view is in direct conflict with the long-standing, if somewhat old-fashioned, interpretation of the Tractatus Logico-Philosophicus advocated by the logical positivists associated with the Vienna Circle.

The therapeutic approach of the New Wittgenstein scholars is not without critics: Hans-Johann Glock argues that the "plain nonsense" reading of the Tractatus "is at odds with the external evidence, writings and conversations in which Wittgenstein states that the Tractatus is committed to the idea of ineffable insight".

There is no unitary "New Wittgenstein" interpretation, and proponents differ deeply among themselves. Philosophers often associated with the interpretation include some who are influential, mostly associated with (although sometimes antagonistic to) the traditions of analytic philosophy, including Stanley Cavell, James F. Conant, John McDowell, Matthew B. Ostrow, Thomas Ricketts, Warren Goldfarb, Hilary Putnam, Stephen Mulhall, Alice Crary, and Cora Diamond. Explicit critics of the "New Wittgenstein" interpretation include P. M. S. Hacker, Ian Proops and Genia Schönbaumsfeld.

== See also ==
- Philosophical quietism
