= Antiphilosophy =

Philosophical notion

Antiphilosophy is an opposition to traditional philosophy. It may be characterized as anti-theoretical, critical of a priori justifications, and may see common philosophical problems as misconceptions that are to be dissolved. Common strategies may involve forms of relativism, skepticism, nihilism, or pluralism.

The term has been used disparagingly, but is also used with more neutral or positive connotations. In the early 1990's Alain Badiou conducted a series of Seminars with the generic topic "Antiphilosophy" and later adopted the word for a number of publications. Boris Groys's 2012 book Introduction to Antiphilosophy discusses thinkers such as Kierkegaard, Lev Shestov, Nietzsche, and Walter Benjamin as belonging to the tradition.

== Usage ==
The word and its cognates ("antiphilosopher", "antiphilosophic") has been in use at least since the 18th century. It was a time when in France progressive intellectuals were called "philosophers", while their opponents styled themselves as "antiphilosophers". So "antiphilosophy" has also a periodizing meaning, loosely equivalent to Counter-Enlightenment.

== Examples of antiphilosophical positions ==
=== Ethics ===
The antiphilosopher could argue that, with regard to ethics, there is only practical, ordinary reasoning. Therefore, a priori it is wrong to superimpose overarching ideas of what is good for philosophical reasons. For example, it is wrong blanketly to assume that only happiness matters, as in utilitarianism. This is not to claim, however, that a utilitarian-like argument may not be valid in some particular case.

=== Continuum hypothesis ===
Consider the continuum hypothesis, stating that there is no set with size strictly between the size of the natural numbers and the size of the real numbers. One idea is that the set universe ought to be rich, with many sets, which leads to the continuum hypothesis being false. This richness argument, the antiphilosopher might argue, is purely philosophical, and groundless, and therefore should be dismissed; maintaining that the continuum hypothesis should be settled by mathematical arguments. In particular it could be the case that the question isn't mathematically meaningful or useful, that the hypothesis is neither true, nor false. It is then wrong to stipulate, a priori and for philosophical reasons, that the continuum hypothesis is true or false. (Note: Cf. and Wittgenstein's view on "pure mathematics".)

=== Scientism ===
Scientism, as a doctrinal position in that science is the only way to know the reality, is continuously confronting the utility and validity of philosophy methods, adopting an anti-philosophical position. Authors like Sam Harris believe that science can, or will, answer questions about morality and ethics, making philosophy useless. In line to Comte's Law of three stages, scientists conclude philosophy is a discipline of plausible answers, but that fails by not verifying their postulates with physical reality, which must necessarily conclude that it is science, for its categorical imperative to respond only through accessible and universal responses to rational-sensitive experience, a stage of knowledge in line with material existence, if not the only one.

== Antiphilosophies ==
=== Wittgenstein's metaphilosophy ===
The views of Ludwig Wittgenstein, specifically his metaphilosophy, could be said to be antiphilosophy. In The New York Times, Paul Horwich points to Wittgenstein's rejection of philosophy as traditionally and currently practiced and his "insistence that it can't give us the kind of knowledge generally regarded as its raison d'être".

Horwich goes on to argue that:

Wittgenstein claims that there are no realms of phenomena whose study is the special business of a philosopher, and about which he or she should devise profound a priori theories and sophisticated supporting arguments. There are no startling discoveries to be made of facts, not open to the methods of science, yet accessible "from the armchair" through some blend of intuition, pure reason and conceptual analysis. Indeed the whole idea of a subject that could yield such results is based on confusion and wishful thinking.

Horwich concludes that, according to Wittgenstein, philosophy "must avoid theory-construction and instead be merely 'therapeutic,' confined to exposing the irrational assumptions on which theory-oriented investigations are based and the irrational conclusions to which they lead".

Moreover, these antiphilosophical views are central to Wittgenstein, Horwich argues.

Boris Groys's 2012 book Introduction to Antiphilosophy discusses thinkers such as Kierkegaard, Shestov, Nietzsche, and Benjamin, characterizing their work as privileging life and action over thought.

=== Pyrrhonism ===
Pyrrhonism has been considered an antiphilosophy.

== See also ==
- Quietism also takes a therapeutic approach to philosophy.
- Non-philosophy
- Irrationalism
