= Quill Kukla =

Canadian and American philosopher

Quill R. Kukla
- Born: Rebecca Kukla; Los Angeles, US
- Occupations: Philosopher; geographer

Education
- Education: University of Pittsburgh
- Doctoral advisor: John Haugeland

Philosophical work
- Era: Contemporary philosophy
- School: Pittsburgh school, Standpoint theory
- Institutions: Georgetown University
- Main interests: Bioethics; epistemology; philosophy of language; feminist philosophy

Quill Kukla (previously known as Rebecca Kukla) is a Canadian and American philosopher. They are a professor of philosophy at Georgetown University and the Senior Research Scholar at the Kennedy Institute of Ethics. In 2020 and 2021, they were Humboldt Research Scholar at Leibniz University Hannover. They are known for their work in bioethics, analytic epistemology, philosophy of language, and feminist philosophy.

== Biography ==
Kukla received their bachelor's degree in philosophy at the University of Toronto in 1990 and their PhD in philosophy at the University of Pittsburgh, where their supervisor was John Haugeland. Kukla held various academic appointments in the United States and Canada before taking up their current post at Georgetown; these include Johns Hopkins University, Queen's University at Kingston, Carleton University (where they held a tenured appointment), and the University of South Florida. At the latter, they were professor in both the Department of Philosophy and in the School of Medicine. Kukla is editor-in-chief of the Kennedy Institute of Ethics Journal and former editor-in-chief of Public Affairs Quarterly. They were formerly co-coordinator of the Feminist Approaches to Bioethics network. They completed a master's degree in geography at Hunter College in 2019.

Kukla has been interviewed about their work in various venues, including 3:AM, The Washington Post, The Huffington Post, Slate, and Quartz. Their work on historical, cultural, and political attitudes towards bodies, especially those of mothers and pregnant women—found in their 2005 book, Mass Hysteria: Medicine, Culture, and Mothers' Bodies—has led to their being interviewed and authoring media articles on topics including the culture of pregnancy, sexual fetishes, and attitudes towards race and obesity. They are a vocal defender of women, ethnic minorities, and other minorities, especially in academia, and have been interviewed in the media on this topic.

Kukla additionally competes in powerlifting, and they have won national and state-level medals in the discipline.

== Publications ==
Books

- R. Kukla, Mass Hysteria: Medicine, Culture and Mothers' Bodies (Lanham, MD: Rowman & Littlefield, 2005)
- R. Kukla and M. Lance, 'Yo!' and 'Lo!': The Pragmatic Topography of the Space of Reasons (Cambridge: Harvard University Press, 2009)
- Q. R Kukla, City Living: How Urban Spaces and Urban Dwellers Make One Another (New York: Oxford University Press, 2021)
- Q. R Kukla, Sex Beyond 'Yes!': Pleasure and Agency for Everyone (W. W. Norton & Co., 2025)

Edited books

- R. Kukla, ed. Aesthetics and Cognition in Kant's Critical Philosophy (Cambridge University Press, 2006)
- J. Arras, R. Kukla, and E. Fenton, ed. The Routledge Companion to Bioethics (Routledge, 2012)

Dissertation Rebecca Kukla, Conformity, Creativity, and the Social Constitution of the Subject (Department of Philosophy, University of Pittsburgh: 1995).
