= Albrecht Wellmer =

German philosopher

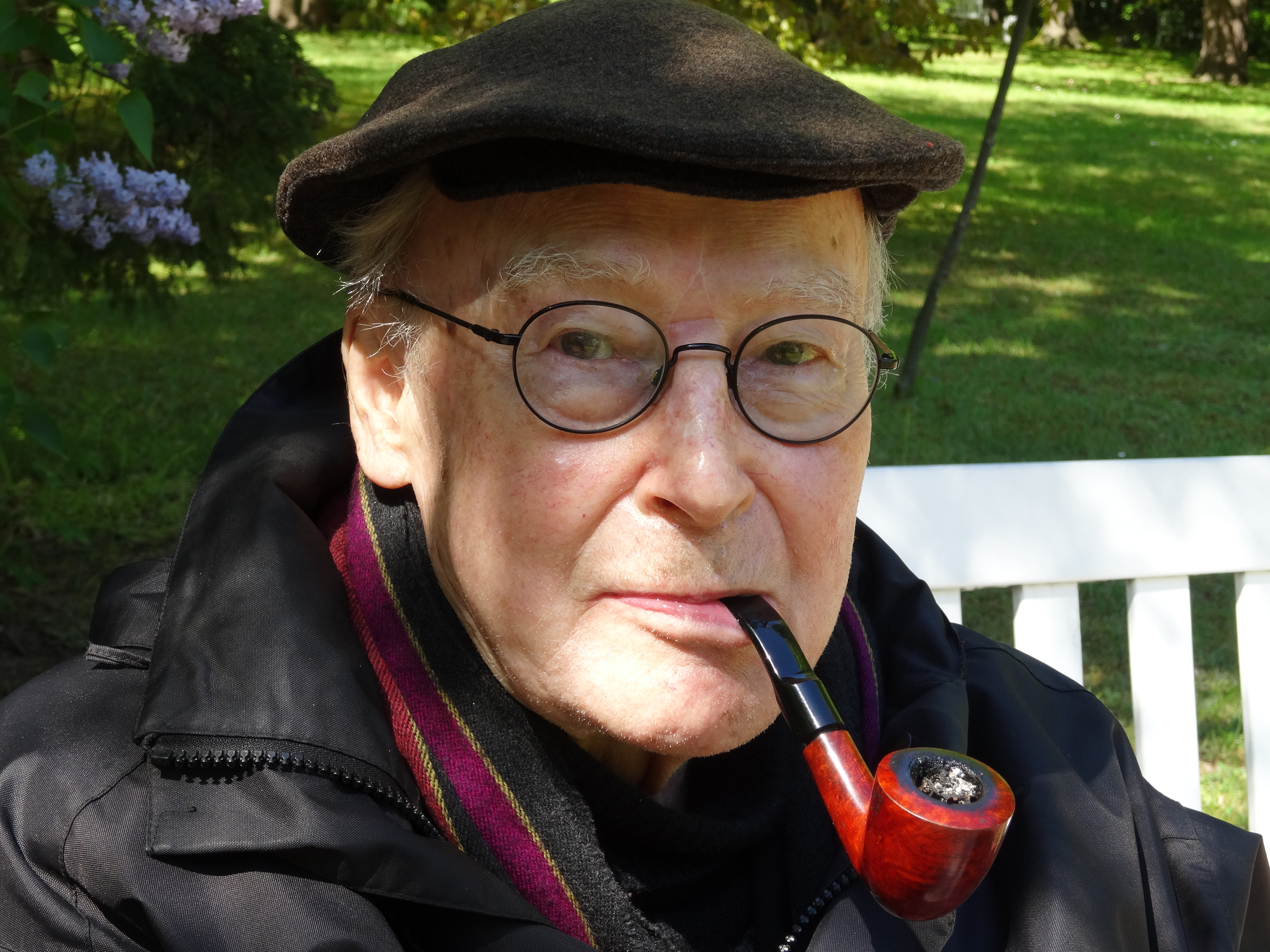
- Albrecht Wellmer, 2014
- Born: 9 July 1933; Bergkirchen, Nazi Germany
- Died: 13 September 2018 (aged 85); Berlin, Germany

Education
- Education: Freie Universität Berlin, University of Kiel, Heidelberg University, Goethe University Frankfurt
- Thesis: Methodologie als Erkenntnistheorie: Zur Wissenschaftslehre Karl R. Poppers (1966)
- Doctoral advisor: Theodor Adorno
- Other advisor: Jürgen Habermas

Philosophical work
- Era: Contemporary philosophy
- Region: Western philosophy
- School: Frankfurt School critical theory
- Institutions: Goethe University Frankfurt
- Doctoral students: Andrea Kern, Christoph Menke, Moishe Postone, Sebastian Rödl, Ruth Sonderegger
- Main interests: Aesthetics, ethics

Albrecht Wellmer (German: [ˈvɛlmɐ]; 9 July 1933 – 13 September 2018) was a German philosopher at the Freie Universität Berlin.

== Biography ==
He studied mathematics and physics at Berlin and Kiel, then philosophy and sociology at Heidelberg and Frankfurt. He was an assistant to Jürgen Habermas at the University of Frankfurt from 1966 to 1970. He has held Professorships at the Universität Konstanz (1974–1990), the New School for Social Research and at the Freie Universität Berlin (1990 until his retirement in 2001). He has held guest Professorships at Haverford, Stony Brook, Collège International de Philosophie, the New School of Social Research and the University of Amsterdam.

== Awards ==
In 2006 he received the Theodor W. Adorno Award, a prestigious award for achievement in philosophy, theatre, music, and film. In 2011 he received the Anna-Krüger-Preis of the Berlin Institute for Advanced Study.

== Personal life ==
From 1965 to 1981 Albrecht Wellmer was married to Ilse von Neander. He is the father of composer and artist Anne Wellmer. Albrecht Wellmer's grave is at Alter St. Matthäus Kirchhof in Berlin.
