= Sebastian Rödl =

German philosopher (born 1967)

- Born: 1967 (age 58–59); Mainz, West Germany

Education
- Education: Goethe University Frankfurt; Free University of Berlin
- Thesis: Selbstbezug und Normativität (1997)
- Doctoral advisor: Albrecht Wellmer
- Other advisor: John McDowell

Philosophical work
- Era: Contemporary philosophy
- Region: Western philosophy
- School: Analytic philosophy German idealism
- Institutions: University of Leipzig
- Main interests: Self-consciousness, metaphysics, meta-ethics

Sebastian Rödl (German: [ˈʁøːdl̩]; born 1967) is a German philosopher and professor of practical philosophy at the University of Leipzig. From 2005 to 2012 he was professor of philosophy at the University of Basel.

== Biography ==
Rödl studied philosophy, musicology, German literature and history in Frankfurt am Main and Berlin, and completed his doctoral dissertation under the supervision of Albrecht Wellmer. His work focuses on the self-conscious nature of human thought and action. His main influence is Hegel, and he sees himself as introducing and restating Hegel's absolute idealism in a historical moment that is fraught with misgivings about the merits and even the mere possibility of such a philosophy.

== Publications ==
- Self-Consciousness and Objectivity: An Introduction to Absolute Idealism, Harvard University Press 2018.
- Categories of the Temporal. An inquiry into the forms of the finite understanding, Harvard University Press 2012.
- Self-Consciousness, Cambridge/Mass., London: Harvard University Press 2007.
- "Law as the Reality of the Free Will", in A. Speer et al. (eds.), The New Desire for Metaphysics, Berlin: De Gruyter 2015.
- "Joint Action and Recursive Consciousness of Consciousness", Phenomenology and the Cognitive Sciences 14/4, 2015.

=== Articles ===
- "Logic, Being and Nothing". Hegel Bulletin. 40 (1): 92–120. April 2019. doi:10.1017/hgl.2018.20. ISSN 2051-5367.
- "Logical Form as a Relation to the Object". Philosophical Topics. 34 (1/2): 345–369. 2006. ISSN 0276-2080.
