= Matthew Boyle =

American philosopher

- Born: Matthew Brendan Boyle; 1972 (age 53–54)

Education
- Education: Harvard University (BA); University of Oxford (BPhil); University of Pittsburgh (PhD)
- Thesis: Kant and the Significance of Self-Consciousness (2005)
- Doctoral advisor: John McDowell
- Other advisors: James Conant, Robert Brandom, Stephen Engstrom, Michael Thompson

Philosophical work
- Era: Contemporary philosophy
- Region: Western philosophy
- School: Analytic philosophy Pittsburgh school
- Institutions: University of Chicago
- Main interests: Philosophy of mind

Matthew Brendan Boyle (born 1972) is an American philosopher and Emerson and Grace Wineland Pugh Professor of Humanities at the University of Chicago. He is known for his works on the philosophy of mind and on some issues in the history of philosophy.

== Publications ==
=== Monographs ===
- Boyle, Matthew (March 4, 2024). Transparency and Reflection: A Study of Self-Knowledge and the Nature of Mind (1 ed.). Oxford University PressNew York. doi:10.1093/oso/9780199926299.001.0001. ISBN 978-0-19-992629-9.

=== Articles ===
- Boyle, Matthew (2016). "Additive Theories of Rationality: A Critique". European Journal of Philosophy. 24 (3): 527–555. doi:10.1111/ejop.12135. ISSN 1468-0378.
