= Kennedy Institute of Ethics Journal =

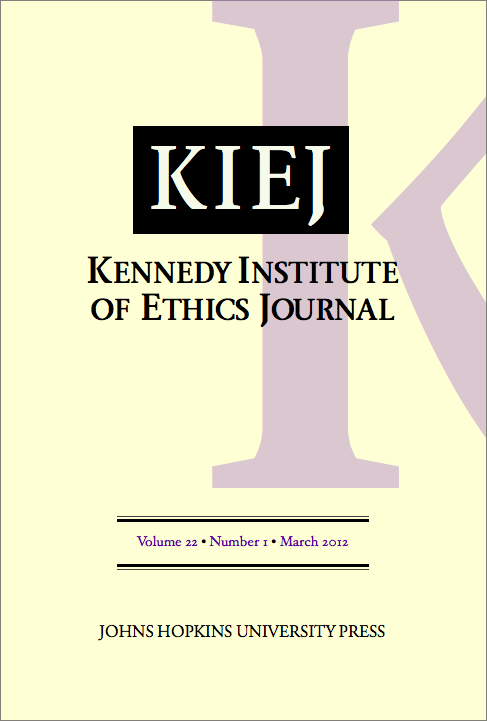
- Discipline: Bioethics
- Language: English
- Edited by: Quill Kukla

Publication details
- History: 1991–present
- Publisher: Johns Hopkins University Press for the Kennedy Institute of Ethics (United States)
- Frequency: Quarterly
- Impact factor: 1.129 (2015)

Standard abbreviations
- ISO 4: Kennedy Inst. Ethics J.

Indexing
- CODEN: KIEJEF
- ISSN: 1054-6863 (print); 1086-3249 (web)
- LCCN: 91640680
- OCLC no.: 33892866

Links
- Journal homepage; Journal page at publisher's website; Online access

The Kennedy Institute of Ethics Journal is a quarterly academic journal established in 1991. It is published by the Johns Hopkins University Press on behalf of the Kennedy Institute of Ethics and focuses on questions of bioethics such as those relating to the research of and therapeutic use of human embryonic stem cells, organ donation, and genetic manipulation, as well as issues of global justice, research in the developing world, environmental ethics, food ethics, and issues of governance and expertise in clinical research.

The current editor-in-chief is Quill Kukla.

According to the Journal Citation Reports, the journal has a 2015 impact factor of 1.129, ranking it 22nd out of 51 journals in the category "Ethics".

== See also ==
- List of ethics journals
