= John Locke Lectures =

Series of annual lectures

The John Locke Lectures are a series of annual lectures in philosophy given at the University of Oxford. Named for British philosopher John Locke, the Locke Lectures are the world's most prestigious lectures in philosophy, and are among the world's most prestigious academic lectures. They were established in 1950 by the bequest of Henry Wilde. Another comparable lecture series is the Gifford Lectures, which are delivered annually at several universities in Scotland.

The first lecture series was offered to Ludwig Wittgenstein, who eventually declined. He felt uncomfortable giving formal lectures where the audience would not be asking or answering questions.

== Lecturers ==
The lectures began as an uncertain biennial series, with the first lecturer from 1950 to 1951, and missing the second slot from 1952 to 1953. Between 1969 and 2001, the lectures became gradually more frequent. Since 2001, the lecture notes have been made available electronically.

Year	Lecturer	Lectures published as
1950–1951	Oets Kolk Bouwsma
1952–1953	no lectures
1954–1955	Hao Wang
1955–1956	Arthur Prior	Time and Modality (1957)
1957–1958	A.C. Jackson
1959–1960	Gregory Vlastos
1961–1962	Nelson Goodman	Languages of Art (1968)
1963–1964	Jaakko Hintikka
1965–1966	Wilfrid Sellars	Science and Metaphysics (1968)
1967–1968	Paul Lorenzen
1968–1969	Noam Chomsky
1969–1970	Donald Davidson	The Structure of Truth (2020)
1971–1972	Sydney Shoemaker
1973–1974	Saul Kripke	Reference and Existence (2013)
1974–1975	Richard Brandt
1975–1976	Hilary Putnam
1976–1977	no lectures
1977–1978	no lectures
1978–1979	Paul Grice	Aspects of Reason (2005)
1979–1980	David Kaplan (Note: Postponed.)
1980–1981	no lectures
1981–1982	no lectures
1982–1983	Daniel Dennett	Elbow Room: The Varieties of Free Will Worth Wanting (1984)
1983–1984	David Lewis	On the Plurality of Worlds (1986)
1984–1985	no lectures
1985–1986	no lectures
1986–1987	Barry Stroud	The Quest for Reality (2000)
1987–1988	no lectures
1988–1989	no lectures (Note: Ernst Tugendhat was due to deliver the lectures, but withdrew due to illness.)
1989–1990	Thomas Nagel	Equality and Partiality (1991)
1990–1991	John McDowell	Mind and World (1994)

Year	Lecturer	Lectures published as
1991–1992	Jonathan Bennett
1992–1993	Tyler Burge
1993–1994	no lectures
1994–1995	Frank Jackson	From Metaphysics to Ethics (1998)
1995–1996	no lectures
1996–1997	Jerry Fodor (Note: Two sets of Locke Lectures were delivered during the 1996–1997 academic year: One by Jerry Fodor in Michaelmas term 1996, and another by Robert Nozick in Trinity term 1997. Since then, all Locke Lectures have been held in Trinity term.)	Concepts: Where Cognitive Science Went Wrong (1998)
1996–1997	Robert Nozick	Invariances (2001)
1998	Lawrence Sklar	Theory and Truth: Philosophical Critique Within Foundational Science (2000)
1999	no lectures
2000	no lectures
2001	Bas van Fraassen
2002	Christine Korsgaard	Self-Constitution: Agency, Identity, Integrity (2009)
2003	Kit Fine	Semantic Relationism (2007)
2004	Jonathan Barnes	Truth, etc. (2007)
2005	Ernest Sosa	A Virtue Epistemology: Apt Belief and Reflective Knowledge, Volume 1 (2007)
2006	Robert Brandom	Between Saying and Doing (2008)
2007	Robert Stalnaker	Our Knowledge of the Internal World (2008)
2008	Hartry Field
2009	Thomas M. Scanlon	Being Realistic about Reasons (2013)
2010	David Chalmers	Constructing the World (2012)
2011	John Cooper	Pursuits of Wisdom: Six Ways of Life in Ancient Philosophy from Socrates to Plotinus (2012)
2012	Stephen Yablo	Aboutness (2014)
2013	Ned Block
2014	Martha Nussbaum	Anger and Forgiveness (2016)
2015	Rae Langton
2016	Ted Sider	The Tools of Metaphysics and the Metaphysics of Science (2020)
2017	Michael Smith
2018	Peter Railton
2019	Philip Pettit	When Minds Converse: A Social Genealogy of the Human Soul (2025)
2020	Susan Wolf (Note: Postponed due to the COVID-19 pandemic.)
2022	Angelika Kratzer
2023	Jennifer Nagel
2024	Jonardon Ganeri
2025	Richard Pettigrew
