= Mark de Bretton Platts =

English philosopher

Mark de Bretton Platts (born 1947) is an English philosopher who is Research Professor of Philosophy at the Instituto de Investigaciones Filosóficas de la Universidad Nacional Autónoma de México (Institute for Philosophical Investigation, National Autonomous University of Mexico). He is well known for criticizing the Humean theory of motivation, especially in his book Ways of Meaning (1979/1997).

== Life ==
Platts was born in England in 1947. He studied philosophy at University College, Oxford, where he received his Bachelor of Philosophy in 1972. He has won several prizes for his academic work, such as the Henry Wilde Prize (in 1969) and the John Locke Prize (in 1971) from Oxford University.

Platts was a lecturer at Birkbeck College, University of London, for a period in the 1970s and 1980s, where he lectured on philosophical logic and the philosophy of language and also on Descartes and Locke. His colleagues included Roger Scruton, Ian McFetridge, and Samuel Guttenplan.

Platts was a strong believer in the tutorial system at Birkbeck.

== Work ==
Some of Platts's work has been highly influential. He is well known for his criticisms of the Humean theory of motivation and is considered an "Anti-Humean" (along with philosophers like John McDowell). This issue has generated a large body of research in the late 20th century. For example, Michael Smith discusses Platts's Anti-Humeanism at length in his influential book The Moral Problem (1994), which won the Book Prize of the American Philosophical Association in 2000.

Platts's book, Ways of Meaning (1979/1997) has been cited by many prominent philosophers, such as Simon Blackburn, Philip Pettit, William Lycan, Christopher Peacocke, and Ernest Lepore---to name a few. A prominent philosopher, Peter Ludlow, writes of Platts's (1979/1997) book:

This is the book that turned on a generation of philosophers of language—turned them on to the Davidsonian program, that is ... More than that, he surveyed a number of natural language constructions, showing how they could be handled in such a framework, and thereby mapping out the landscape of what has since become a full-blown philosophical research program.

== Publications ==
The following is a partial list of publications by Platts.

=== Books ===
- Ways of Meaning: An Introduction to a Philosophy of Language (1979), First Edition, Routledge and Kegan Paul.
- (editor) Reference, Truth, and Reality: Essays on the Philosophy of Language (1980), Routledge and Kegan Paul. (ISBN 0710004060, ISBN 978-0-7100-0406-2)
- Moral Realities: An Essay in Philosophical Psychology (1991), Routledge. (ISBN 0415058929, ISBN 978-0-415-05892-6)
- Ways of Meaning: An Introduction to a Philosophy of Language (1997), Second Edition, MIT Press. (ISBN 0262661071, ISBN 978-0-262-66107-2)
- Sobre usos y abusos de la moral (1999), Paidós-National University of Mexico. (ISBN 9789688534168)
- (editor) Conceptos morales fundamentales (2007), National University of Mexico. (ISBN 9789688534168)
- Ser responsable (2012), National University of Mexico. (ISBN 9786070227325)

=== Articles ===
- "Moral Reality and the End of Desire" in Platts (1980).

=== Festschrift in honor of Mark Platts ===
- Mente, lenguaje y moralidad (2015), edited by G. Ortiz Millán and J.A. Cruz Parcero, National University of Mexico (ISBN 9786070250415).
