= John Tienson =

American philosopher (1940–2018)

- Born: 1940
- Died: 2018 (aged 77–78)

Philosophical work
- Era: 21st-century philosophy
- Region: Western philosophy
- Main interests: Philosophy of Language

John L. Tienson (1940–2018) was an American philosopher and professor emeritus of philosophy at the University of Memphis. He served as Co-Editor of the Southern Journal of Philosophy.
