= Charles Travis =

American philosopher

- Born: 1943 (age 82–83)

Education
- Education: University of California, Berkeley (BA, 1963); University of California, Los Angeles (PhD, 1967)

Philosophical work
- Institutions: University of Stirling, Northwestern University, King's College London, University of Porto
- Main interests: Metaphysics, philosophy of language, philosophy of logic, philosophy of psychology, philosophy of mind, epistemology, thought, mental representation, experience
- Notable ideas: Radical semantic contextualism

Charles Travis (born 1943) is an American-Portuguese philosopher. His main interests in philosophy center on philosophy of language, metaphysics, and epistemology.

== Biography ==
Travis received his Bachelor of Arts from University of California, Berkeley and Doctor of Philosophy from the University of California, Los Angeles, respectively in 1963 and 1967. Over the years, Travis has taught at multiple universities, such as the University of Michigan and Harvard University, before he settled as emeritus professor at King's College London and Professor Afiliado ('affiliate Professor') at the University of Porto.

He has been influenced by numerous philosophers, mainly in the sphere of ordinary language philosophy, such as Hilary Putnam, Ludwig Wittgenstein, J. L. Austin, Noam Chomsky and John McDowell.

Travis is commonly considered one of the main proponents of radical semantic contextualism. He is also accredited with coining the influential notion of occasion-sensitivity. On top of that, the philosophical concept of Travis's examples carries his name.

== Notable works ==
- Meaning's Role in Truth (1996)
- The silence of the senses (2004)
- The Face of Perception (2005)
- Occasion-Sensitivity: Selected Essays (2008)
- Objectivity and the parochial (2011)
- As a Matter of Fact (2013)
