= Italo Testa =

Italian philosopher and poet (1972-)

Italo Testa (born September 13, 1972, Castell'Arquato) is an Italian philosopher and poet at the University of Parma.

== Life and works ==
Testa received a Ph.D. in Philosophy from the Ca' Foscari University of Venice (February 2002), after earning a B.A. in Philosophy cum laude from the same university in June 1997. During doctoral studies, he served as a visiting Ph.D. student at the Hegel-Archiv, Ruhr University Bochum (February–October 1999), and at the Goethe University Frankfurt (April–October 2000).

== Selected publications‌ ==
=== ‌Books ===
==== As Author ====
- Testa, Italo (2010). La natura del riconoscimento. Riconoscimento naturale e ontologia sociale in Hegel. ITA. ISBN 978-88-575-0096-6.
- Testa, Italo (2002). Hegel critico e scettico. Illuminismo, repubblicanesimo e antinomia alle origini della dialettica. ITA. ISBN 978-88-7115-272-1.

==== As Editor ====
- Caruana, Fausto; Testa, Italo, eds. (2020). Habits: Pragmatist Approaches from Cognitive Science, Neuroscience, and Social Theory. Cambridge: Cambridge University Press. doi:10.1017/9781108682312. ISBN 978-1-108-49844-9.
- Testa, Italo; Ruggiu, Luigi, eds. (2016-08-01). "I that is We, We that is I." Perspectives on Contemporary Hegel: Social Ontology, Recognition, Naturalism, and the Critique of Kantian Constructivism. Brill. doi:10.1163/9789004322967. ISBN 978-90-04-32296-7.
- Testa, Italo; Ruggiu, Luigi, eds. (2009). Lo spazio sociale della ragione: da Hegel in avanti (in Italian). Mimesis. ISBN 978-88-8483-958-9.
- Testa, Italo; Ruggiu, L. (2003). Hegel contemporaneo. La ricezione americana di Hegel a confronto con la tradizione europea.

=== Articles ===
- "Life and the two-fold structure of domination: subjugation and recognition in Hegel's master-servant dialectics". Intellectual History Review. 31 (3): 427–444. 2021-07-03. doi:10.1080/17496977.2021.1955647. ISSN 1749-6977.
- "How does Recognition Emerge from Nature? The Genesis of Consciousness in Hegel's Jena Writings". Critical Horizons. 13 (2): 176–196. 2012. doi:10.1558/crit.v13i2.176. ISSN 1440-9917.
