= Hans Sluga =

German philosopher (born 1937)

Hans D. Sluga (German: [ˈsluːga]; born 24 April 1937) is a German philosopher who has spent most of his career as professor of philosophy at the University of California, Berkeley. Sluga teaches and writes on topics in the history of analytic philosophy, the history of continental philosophy, as well as on political theory, and ancient philosophy in Greece and China. He has been particularly influenced by the thought of Gottlob Frege, Ludwig Wittgenstein, Martin Heidegger, Friedrich Nietzsche, and Michel Foucault.

== Education and career ==
Hans Sluga studied at the University of Bonn and LMU Munich. He subsequently obtained a BPhil at the University of Oxford, where he studied under R. M. Hare, Isaiah Berlin, Gilbert Ryle and Michael Dummett.

Since 1970, Sluga has been a professor of philosophy at the University of California, Berkeley, serving from 2009 as the William and Trudy Ausfahl Professor of Philosophy until his retirement in 2020. He previously served as a lecturer in philosophy at University College London.

== Philosophical work ==
Sluga describes his philosophical orientation as follows: "My overall philosophical outlook is radically historicist. I believe that we can understand ourselves only as beings with a particular evolution and history."

He has worked extensively on the early history of analytic philosophy. In his writings on Gottlob Frege he has sought to establish the influence of Immanuel Kant, Hermann Lotze, and of neo-Kantians like Kuno Fischer and Wilhelm Windelband on Frege's views on the foundations of mathematics and in the theory of meaning. This historically oriented approach to Frege's thought brought him into sharp conflict with Michael Dummett's "realist" interpretation of Frege. Sluga's work in analytic philosophy has been influenced substantially by Wittgenstein to whose early and late writings he has devoted a number of studies. His writings on both Frege and Wittgenstein have contributed to the development of the study of the history of analytic philosophy as a field within analytic philosophy.

Since the early 1990s, Sluga has become increasingly concerned with political philosophy. In Heidegger's Crisis, he set out to explore the question of why philosophers from Plato till the present get so often entangled in dangerous political affairs. Sluga analyzes Heidegger's political engagement by putting it into the larger context of the development of German philosophy in the Nazi period. He seeks to show thereby that many diagnoses of Heidegger's politics are misdirected because of their overly narrow focus on the person and work of Heidegger. He challenges, in particular, the claim that Heidegger's critique of reason is to blame for his political errors by pointing out that committed "rationalists" among the German philosophers were prone to the same errors. Sluga's book seeks to show that the willingness of not only Heidegger, but also of neo-Kantians like Bruno Bauch, neo-Fichteans like Max Wundt, and Nietzscheans like Alfred Baeumler to involve themselves politically was ultimately due to a misconceived belief that they were living through a moment of world-historical crisis in which they were particularly called upon to intervene.

His book Politics and the Search for the Common Good seeks to re-think politics in substantially new terms. Sluga distinguishes in it between a long tradition of "normative political theorizing" that ranges from Plato and Aristotle through Kant to contemporary writers like John Rawls and a more recent form of "diagnostic practice" that emerged in the 19th century and whose first practitioners were Karl Marx and Friedrich Nietzsche. Diagnostic political philosophy, Sluga argues, does not seek to establish political norms through a process of abstract philosophical reasoning but seeks to reach practical conclusions through a careful diagnosis of the political realities. Identifying himself with this strand of political philosophizing, Sluga proceeds to examine the thinking of Carl Schmitt, Hannah Arendt, and Michel Foucault as 20th century exemplars of the diagnostic approach. The book seeks to highlight the promise and the achievements of the diagnostic method as well as its shortcomings so far and its inherent limitations. In doing so, Sluga maps out an understanding of politics that makes use of some of Wittgenstein's methodological concepts. He characterizes politics as a family resemblance phenomenon and argues that the concept of politics does not identify a natural kind. It is therefore also mistaken to assume that there is a single common good at which all politics aims. Similarly, we must forgo the belief that there is a best form of government (as, e.g., democracy). Politics must, rather, be conceived as a continuous search for a common good which can have no final, conclusive answer. It is a sphere of uncertainty in which we always operate with a radically incomplete and unreliable picture of where we are and with only shifting ideas of where we want to go. The institutional forms that this search takes will change over time. Sluga agrees with other diagnostic thinkers that the classical institution of the modern state is now giving way to a new form of political order which he calls "the corporāte," whose challenges are defined by the growth of human populations, rapid technological changes, and an ever more pressing environmental crisis.

== Wittgenstein scholar ==
Sluga is a noted interpreter of Wittgenstein and has contributed significantly to Wittgenstein scholarship, including editing the 1996 volume The Cambridge Companion to Wittgenstein with David G. Stern. He has argued against the relevance of increasingly more detailed and sophisticated analyses of Wittgenstein's work, even claiming that Wittgenstein himself would not have regarded this exegetical excess as a legitimate concern for philosophy. In recent years, he has endorsed Rupert Read's "post-therapeutic" or "liberatory" interpretation of Wittgenstein.

== Books ==
- Gottlob Frege, Routledge & Kegan Paul, London 1980
  - Chinese translation, Beijing 1990, 2nd ed. 1993
  - Greek translation, Athens 2010
- Heidegger's Crisis. Philosophy and Politics in Nazi Germany, Harvard U. P. 1993
  - Chinese translation, Beijing 2015
  - Bulgarian translation, Sofia 2024
- Wittgenstein, Wiley-Blackwell, 2011
  - Italian translation, 2012
  - Arabic translation, 2014
  - Chinese translation, 2015
- Politics and the Search for the Common Good, Cambridge U. P. 2014
- The Philosophy of Frege, (ed.), 4 vols., Garland Press, 1993
- The Cambridge Companion to Wittgenstein, (ed. With David Stern), Cambridge U. P. 1996
  - Licensed Chinese edition, Beijing 2007
