= Post-empiricism =

Post-empiricism is the abandonment of strict empirical methods by modern empiricists. It essentially states that knowledge may be gained through avenues not strictly contained within empirical methods such as sensory observation and measurement. It has been encouraged in fields of research such as psychiatry.

The field has received some appreciation, with an article stating that a lot of "dilemmas" known in the fields of epistemology and philosophy of language are more easily resolvable when viewed from a broadly post‑empiricist standpoint. The paper suggests that many epistemological “dilemmas” arise from forcing issues into empiricist or formalist frameworks.

== See also ==
- Positivism
- Post-positivism
