= Quietism (philosophy) =

View on the purpose of philosophy

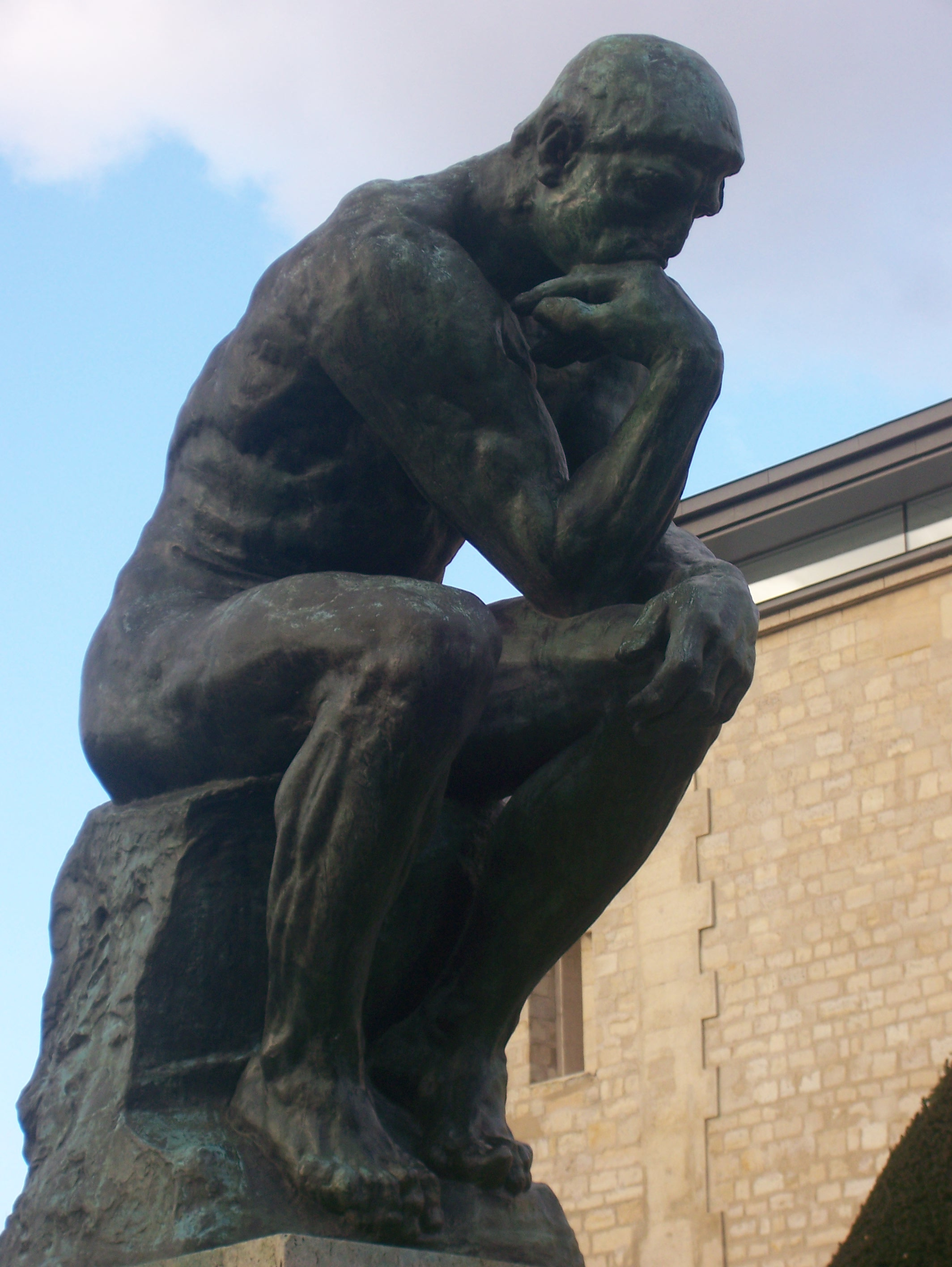
Philosophical quietists want to release humanity from deep perplexity that philosophical contemplation often causes.

Quietism in philosophy sees the role of philosophy as broadly therapeutic or remedial. Quietist philosophers believe that philosophy has no positive thesis to contribute; rather, it defuses confusions in the linguistic and conceptual frameworks of other subjects, including non-quietist philosophy. For quietists, advancing knowledge or settling debates (particularly those between realists and non-realists) is not the job of philosophy, rather philosophy should liberate the mind by diagnosing confusing concepts.

== Status within philosophy ==
Crispin Wright said that "Quietism is the view that significant metaphysical debate is impossible." It has been described as "the view or stance that entails avoidance of substantive philosophical theorizing and is usually associated with certain forms of skepticism, pragmatism, and minimalism about truth. More particularly, it is opposed to putting forth positive theses and developing constructive arguments."

Quietism by its nature is not a philosophical school as understood in the sense of a systematic body of truths. The objective of quietism is to show that philosophical positions or theories cannot solve problems, settle debates or advance knowledge.

It is often raised in discussion as an opposite position to both philosophical realism and anti-realism. Specifically, quietists deny that there is any substantial debate between the positions of realism and non-realism. There are a range of justifications for quietism about the realism debate offered by Gideon Rosen and John McDowell.

== History and proponents ==
=== Ancient ===
Pyrrhonism represents perhaps the earliest example of an identifiably quietist position in the West. The Pyrrhonist philosopher Sextus Empiricus described Pyrrhonism as a form of philosophical therapy:

The causal principle of scepticism we say is the hope of attaining ataraxia (being unperturbed). Men of talent, troubled by the anomaly in things and puzzled as to which of them they should rather assent to, came to investigate what in things is true and what false, thinking that by deciding these issues they would attain ataraxia. The chief constitutive principle of scepticism is the claim that to every account an equal account is opposed; for it is from this, we think, that we come to hold no beliefs.

— Sextus Empiricus, Outlines of Pyrrhonism, Book I, Chapter 12

Some have identified Epicureans as another early proponent of quietism. The goals of Epicurean philosophy are the decidedly quietist objectives of aponia (freedom from pain) and ataraxia, even dismissing Stoic logic as useless.

The neo-Confucian philosopher Cheng Hao is also associated with advocating quietism. He argued that the goal of existence should be calming one's natural biases and embracing impartial tranquility. This aversion to bias is nevertheless quite distinct from Wittgenstein's position.

=== Contemporary ===
Contemporary discussion of quietism can be traced back to Ludwig Wittgenstein, whose work greatly influenced the ordinary language philosophers. While Wittgenstein himself did not advocate quietism, he expressed sympathy with the viewpoint. One of the early 'ordinary language' works, Gilbert Ryle's The Concept of Mind, attempted to demonstrate that dualism arises from a failure to appreciate that mental vocabulary and physical vocabulary are simply different ways of describing one and the same thing, namely human behaviour. J. L. Austin's Sense and Sensibilia took a similar approach to the problems of skepticism and the reliability of sense perception, arguing that they arise only by misconstruing ordinary language, not because there is anything genuinely wrong with empirical evidence. Norman Malcolm, a friend of Wittgenstein's, took a quietist approach to skeptical problems in the philosophy of mind.

More recently, the philosophers John McDowell, Irad Kimhi, Sabina Lovibond, Eric Marcus, Gideon Rosen, and to a certain degree Richard Rorty have taken explicitly quietist positions. Pete Mandik has argued for a position of qualia quietism on the hard problem of consciousness.

== Varieties ==
Some philosophers have advanced quietism about specific subjects such as realism or truth. These positions can be held independent of one's view on quietism about the entire project of philosophy.

=== On realism ===
One may be a realist about a range of subjects within philosophy from ethics and aesthetics to science and mathematics. Realists claim that a given concept exists, has particular properties and is in some way mind independent, while non-realists deny this claim. Quietists take a third position, claiming that there is no real debate between realists and non-realists on a given subject. A version of this position espoused by John McDowell claims that the debate hinges on theses about the relationship between the mind and the world around us that are unsupported or unsupportable, and without those claims there will be no debate. Others, such as Gideon Rosen argue more specifically against individual cases of the realism debate.

=== On truth ===
Quietism about truth is a version of the identity theory of truth. Specifically, Jennifer Hornsby and John McDowell argue that, when we think truly, there is no ontological gap between what we think and what is actually true. Quietists about truth resist the distinction between truth bearers and truthmakers as leading to a correspondence theory of truth. Rather they claim that such a distinction should be eliminated, true statements are simply one thinking truly about the world. The target of these thoughts is not a truthbearer, but rather the facts of the world themselves.

== See also ==
- Critical philosophy
- Nonsense § Disguised epistemic nonsense for Wittgenstein's approach to philosophical problems
  - The New Wittgenstein
- Fictionalism
- Philosophical hermeneutics
- Therapeutic approach

== Sources ==
- Wittgenstein, Ludwig. Philosophical Investigations. 3rd Rev Edn, Blackwell, 2002. ISBN 0-631-23127-7
- Ryle, Gilbert. The Concept of Mind. London: Hutchinson, 1949. ISBN 0-14-012482-9
- Austin, J L. Sense and Sensibilia. OUP, 1962. ISBN 0-19-881083-0
- Macarthur, David. "Pragmatism, Metaphysical Quietism and the Problem of Normativity", Philosophical Topics. Vol.36 No.1, 2009.
- Malcolm, Norman. Dreaming (Studies in Philosophical Psychology). Routledge & Kegan Paul, 1959. ISBN 0-7100-3836-4
- McDowell, John and Evans, Gareth. Truth and Meaning. Oxford: Clarendon Press, 1976. ISBN 0-19-824517-3
- McDowell, John. Mind and World. New Ed, Harvard, 1996. ISBN 0-674-57610-1
