= Hans-Johann Glock =

German philosopher and professor

Hans-Johann Glock (born 12 February 1960) is a German philosopher and professor of philosophy at the University of Zurich.

== Biography ==
Glock was born in Freudenstadt, West Germany.

He studied philosophy, German studies, and mathematics at University of Tübingen, University of Oxford, and the Free University of Berlin, and in 1990 received his DPhil at Oxford. After lectureships at Oxford and the University of Reading, he was appointed a position in 2006 at the University of Zurich, where he holds a chair in Theoretical Philosophy. He is also visiting professor at the University of Reading.

His research is the fields of philosophy of language, philosophy of mind, and analytic philosophy more broadly. Glock has worked in particular with the topic of concepts and also on the question of animal cognition. Furthermore, Glock is considered to be an expert on the philosophy of Ludwig Wittgenstein.

== Monographs ==
- What is Analytic Philosophy? Cambridge University Press, 2008, ISBN 0-521-87267-7. (abstract)
- Quine and Davidson on Language, Thought and Reality. Cambridge University Press, 2003, ISBN 0-521-82180-0. (abstract)
- A Wittgenstein Dictionary. Wiley-Blackwell, 1996, ISBN 0-631-18112-1. (abstract)

== Edited volumes ==
- Wittgenstein and Analytic Philosophy. Essays for P. M. S. Hacker (with John Hyman). Oxford University Press, 2009. (abstract)
- Strawson and Kant. Oxford University Press, 2003. (abstract)
- Fifty Years of Quine's 'Two Dogmas' (with Kathrin Glüer and Geert Keil). Rodopi, 2003.
