= Robert Brandom =

American philosopher (born 1950)

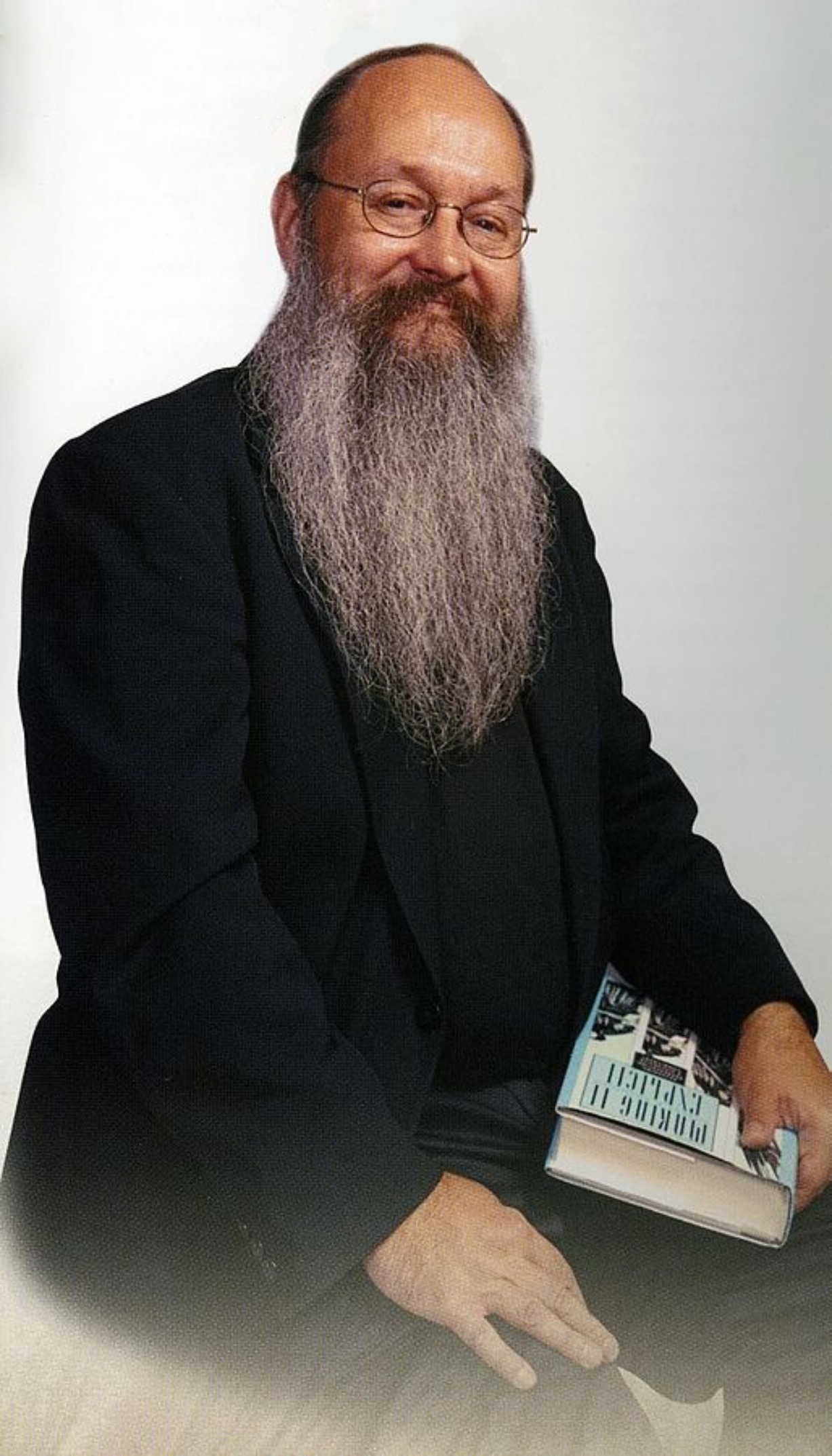
- Born: Robert Boyce Brandom; March 13, 1950 (age 76)

Education
- Education: Yale University (BA, 1972); Princeton University (PhD, 1977)
- Thesis: Practice and Object (1977)
- Doctoral advisor: Richard Rorty; David Lewis

Philosophical work
- Era: Contemporary philosophy
- Region: Western philosophy
- School: Analytic; Pittsburgh school (analytic Hegelianism); Neopragmatism
- Institutions: University of Pittsburgh
- Doctoral students: John McFarlane
- Notable students: Matthew Boyle
- Main interests: Pragmatism; Philosophy of language Philosophy of mind Philosophy of logic History of philosophy
- Notable ideas: Semantic inferentialism Logical expressivism Antirepresentationalism

Robert Boyce Brandom (/ˈbrændəm/; born March 13, 1950) is an American philosopher who teaches at the University of Pittsburgh. He works primarily in philosophy of language, philosophy of mind and philosophical logic, and his academic output manifests both systematic and historical interests in these topics. His work has presented "arguably the first fully systematic and technically rigorous attempt to explain the meaning of linguistic items in terms of their socially norm-governed use ("meaning as use", to cite the Wittgensteinian slogan), thereby also giving a non-representationalist account of the intentionality of thought and the rationality of action as well."

Brandom is broadly considered to be part of the American pragmatist tradition in philosophy. In 2003 he won the Mellon Distinguished Achievement Award.

== Education ==
Brandom earned his BA in 1972 from Yale University and his PhD in 1977 from Princeton University, under Richard Rorty and David Kellogg Lewis. His doctoral thesis was titled Practice and Object.

== Philosophy ==
Brandom's work is heavily influenced by that of Michael Dummett, his doctoral advisor Richard Rorty, and his Pittsburgh colleagues Wilfrid Sellars and John McDowell. He also draws heavily on the works of Immanuel Kant, G. W. F. Hegel, Gottlob Frege, and Ludwig Wittgenstein.

He is best known for his investigations of linguistic meaning, or semantics. He advocates the view that the meaning of an expression is fixed by how it is used in inferences (see inferential role semantics). This project is developed at length in his influential 1994 book Making It Explicit, and more briefly in Articulating Reasons: An Introduction to Inferentialism (2000); a chapter of that latter work, "Semantic Inferentialism and Logical Expressivism", outlines the main themes of representationalism (the tradition of basing semantics on the concept of representation) vs. inferentialism (the conviction that an expression is meaningful due to being governed by rules of inference) and inferentialism's relationship to logical expressivism (the conviction that "logic is expressive in the sense that it makes explicit or codifies certain aspects of the inferential structure of our discursive practice").

Brandom has also published a collection of essays on the history of philosophy, Tales of the Mighty Dead (2002), a critical and historical sketch of what he calls the "philosophy of intentionality". He is the editor of a collection of papers about Richard Rorty's philosophy, Rorty and His Critics (2000). Brandom delivered the 2006 John Locke lectures at Oxford University, which Oxford University Press published under the title Between Saying and Doing: Towards an Analytic Pragmatism (2008). In 2019 he published A Spirit of Trust, a book about Hegel's Phenomenology of Spirit.

== Books ==
- The Logic of Inconsistency, with Nicholas Rescher. Basil Blackwell, Oxford 1980.
- Making It Explicit: Reasoning, Representing, and Discursive Commitment, Harvard University Press (Cambridge) 1994. ISBN 0-674-54319-X
- Empiricism and the Philosophy of Mind, by Wilfrid Sellars, Robert B. Brandom (ed.) Harvard University Press, 1997. With an introduction by Richard Rorty and Study Guide by Robert Brandom ISBN 0-674-25154-7
- Rorty and His Critics, edited, with an introduction (includes "Vocabularies of Pragmatism") by Robert Brandom. Original essays by: Rorty, Habermas, Davidson, Putnam, Dennett, McDowell, Bouveresse, Brandom, Williams, Allen, Bilgrami, Conant, and Ramberg. Blackwell Publishers, Oxford, July 2000 ISBN 0-631-20981-6
- Articulating Reasons: An Introduction to Inferentialism, Harvard University Press, 2000 (paperback 2001), 230 pp. ISBN 0-674-00158-3
- Tales of the Mighty Dead: Historical Essays in the Metaphysics of Intentionality, Harvard University Press, 2002. ISBN 0-674-00903-7
- In the Space of Reasons: Selected Essays of Wilfrid Sellars, edited with an introduction by Kevin Scharp and Robert Brandom. Harvard University Press, 2007. ISBN 0-674-02498-2
- Between Saying and Doing: Towards an Analytic Pragmatism, Oxford University Press, 2008. ISBN 0-199-54287-2
- Reason in Philosophy: Animating Ideas, Harvard University Belknap Press, 2009. ISBN 9780674053618
- Perspectives on Pragmatism: Classical, Recent, & Contemporary, Harvard University Press, 2011. ISBN 978-0-674-05808-8
- From Empiricism to Expressivism: Brandom Reads Sellars, Harvard University Press, 2015 ISBN 978-0674187283
- Wiedererinnerter Idealismus, Suhrkamp Verlag, 2015 ISBN 978-3-518-29704-9 (in German)
- A Spirit of Trust: A Reading of Hegel's Phenomenology, Harvard University Press, 2019. ISBN 978-0674976818
- Pragmatism and Idealism: Rorty and Hegel on Reason and Representation, Oxford University Press, 2023. ISBN 978-0-19-287021-6
- Reasons for Logic, Logic for Reasons: Pragmatics, Semantics, and Conceptual Roles, with Ulf Hlobil. Routledge, 2025. ISBN 978-1032360775
