= John McDowell =

South African philosopher and academic (born 1942)

John McDowell FBA
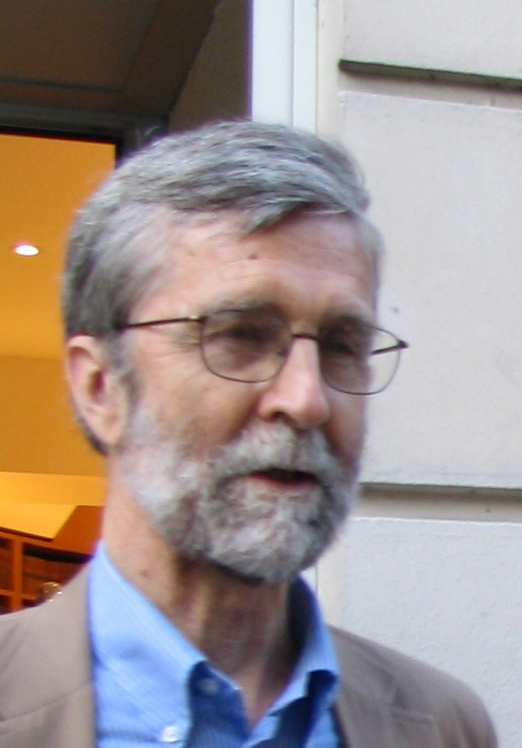
- McDowell in 2007
- Born: John Henry McDowell; 7 March 1942 (age 84); Boksburg, Union of South Africa

Education
- Education: University College of Rhodesia and Nyasaland (as issued by University of London); New College, Oxford
- Academic advisor: David Wiggins

Philosophical work
- Era: 20th-century philosophy
- Region: Western philosophy
- School: Postanalytic philosophy Pittsburgh school (analytic Hegelianism); Direct realism The New Wittgenstein; Aristotelian ethics
- Doctoral students: Anita Avramides, Matthew Boyle, Alice Crary
- Notable students: Sebastian Rödl, Michel Seymour
- Main interests: Metaphysics, epistemology, logic, philosophy of language, philosophy of perception, philosophy of mathematics, philosophy of mind, ethics, meta-ethics
- Notable ideas: Perceptual conceptualism, naturalized Platonism, moral particularism, disjunctivism, minimal empiricism

John Henry McDowell (born 7 March 1942) is a South African philosopher, formerly a fellow of University College, Oxford, and now Distinguished University Professor at the University of Pittsburgh. Although he has written on metaphysics, epistemology, ancient philosophy, nature, and meta-ethics, McDowell's most influential work has been in the philosophy of mind and philosophy of language. McDowell was one of three recipients of the 2010 Andrew W. Mellon Foundation's Distinguished Achievement Award, and is a Fellow of both the American Academy of Arts & Sciences and the British Academy.

McDowell has, throughout his career, understood philosophy to be "therapeutic" and thereby to "leave everything as it is" (Ludwig Wittgenstein, Philosophical Investigations), which he understands to be a form of philosophical quietism (although he does not consider himself to be a "quietist"). The philosophical quietist believes that philosophy cannot make any explanatory comment about how, for example, thought and talk relate to the world but can, by offering re-descriptions of philosophically problematic cases, return the confused philosopher to a state of intellectual perspicacity.

However, in defending this quietistic perspective McDowell has engaged with the work of leading contemporaries in such a way as to therapeutically dissolve what he takes to be philosophical error, while defending major positions and interpretations from major figures in philosophical history, and developing original and distinctive theses about language, mind and value. In each case, he has tried to resist the influence of what he regards as a scientistic, reductive form of philosophical naturalism that has become very commonplace in our historical moment, while nevertheless defending a form of "Aristotelian naturalism," bolstered by key insights from Hegel, Wittgenstein, and others.

== Life and career ==
McDowell was born in Boksburg, South Africa and completed a B.A. at the University College of Rhodesia and Nyasaland. In 1963, he moved to New College, Oxford as a Rhodes scholar, where he earned another B.A. in 1965 and an M.A. in 1969. He taught at University College, Oxford, from 1966 until 1986, when he joined the faculty at the University of Pittsburgh, where he is now a university professor. He has also been a visiting professor at many universities, including Harvard University, University of Michigan, and University of California, Los Angeles.

McDowell was elected a Fellow of the British Academy in 1983 and a Fellow of the American Academy of Arts and Sciences in 1992. In 2010 he received the Andrew W. Mellon Foundation Distinguished Achievement Award in the Humanities.

McDowell delivered the John Locke Lectures in Philosophy at Oxford University in 1991 (these became his book Mind and World.) He has also given the Woodbridge Lectures at Columbia University in 1997 and the Howison Lectures in Philosophy at the University of California at Berkeley in 2006.

He received an honorary degree from the University of Chicago in 2008.

== Philosophical work ==
=== Early work ===
McDowell's earliest published work was in ancient philosophy, most notably including a translation of and commentary on Plato's Theaetetus. In the 1970s he was active in the Davidsonian project of providing a semantic theory for natural language, co-editing (with Gareth Evans) a volume of essays entitled Truth and Meaning. McDowell edited and published Evans's influential posthumous book The Varieties of Reference (1982).

In his early work, McDowell was very much involved both with the development of the Davidsonian semantic programme and with the internecine dispute between those who take the core of a theory that can play the role of a theory of meaning to involve the grasp of truth conditions, and those, such as Michael Dummett, who argued that linguistic understanding must, at its core, involve the grasp of assertion conditions. If, Dummett argued, the core of a theory that is going to do duty for a theory of a meaning is supposed to represent a speaker's understanding, then that understanding must be something of which a speaker can manifest a grasp. McDowell argued, against this Dummettian view and its development by such contemporaries as Crispin Wright, both that this claim did not, as Dummett supposed, represent a Wittgensteinian requirement on a theory of meaning and that it rested on a suspect asymmetry between the evidence for the expressions of mind in the speech of others and the thoughts so expressed. This particular argument reflects McDowell's wider commitment to the idea that, when we understand others, we do so from "inside" our own practices: Wright and Dummett are treated as pushing the claims of explanation too far and as continuing W. V. O. Quine's project of understanding linguistic behaviour from an "external" perspective.

In these early exchanges and in the parallel debate over the proper understanding of Wittgenstein's remarks on rule-following, some of McDowell's characteristic intellectual stances were formed: to borrow a Wittgensteinian expression, the defence of a realism without empiricism, an emphasis on the human limits of our aspiration to objectivity, the idea that meaning and mind can be directly manifested in the action, particularly linguistic action, of other people, and a distinctive disjunctive theory of perceptual experience.

The latter is an account of perceptual experience, developed at the service of McDowell's realism, in which it is denied that the argument from illusion supports an indirect or representative theory of perception as that argument presupposes that there is a "highest common factor" shared by veridical and illusory (or, more accurately, delusive) experiences. (There is clearly a distinction between perceiving and acquiring a belief: one can see an "apparently bent" stick in the water but not believe that it is bent as one knows that one's experience is illusory. In illusions, you need not believe that things are as the illusory experiences represent them as being; in delusions, a person believes what their experience represents to them. So the argument from illusion is better described as an argument from delusion if it is to make its central point.)

In the classic argument from illusion (delusion) you are asked to compare a case where you succeed in perceiving, say, a cat on a mat, to the case where a trick of light deceives you and form the belief that the cat is on the mat, when it is not. The proponent of the argument then says that the two states of mind in these contrasting cases share something important in common, and to characterise this we need to introduce an idea like that of "sense data." Acquaintance with such data is the "highest common factor" across the two cases. That seems to force us into a concession that our knowledge of the external world is indirect and mediated via such sense data. McDowell strongly resists this argument: he does not deny that there is something psychologically in common between the subject who really sees the cat and the one that fails to do so. But that psychological commonality has no bearing on the status of the judger's state of mind from the point of view of assessing whether she is in a position to acquire knowledge. In favourable conditions, experience can be such as to make manifest the presence of objects to observers – that is perceptual knowledge. When we succeed in knowing something by perceiving it, experience does not fall short of the fact known. But this just shows that a successful and a failed perceptual thought have nothing interesting in common from the point of view of appraising them as knowledge.

In this claim that a veridical perception and a non-veridical perception share no highest common factor, a theme is visible which runs throughout McDowell's work, namely, a commitment to seeing thoughts as essentially individuable only in their social and physical environment, so called externalism about the mental. McDowell defends, in addition to a general externalism about the mental, a specific thesis about the understanding of demonstrative expressions as involving so-called "singular" or "Russellian" thoughts about particular objects that reflects the influence on his views of Gareth Evans. According to this view, if the putative object picked out by the demonstrative does not exist, then such an object dependent thought cannot exist – it is, in the most literal sense, not available to be thought.

=== Value theory ===
In parallel with the development of this work on mind and language, McDowell also made significant contributions to moral philosophy, specifically meta-ethical debates over the nature of moral reasons and moral objectivity. McDowell developed the view that has come to be known as secondary property realism, or sensibility or moral sense theory. The theory proceeds via the device of an ideally virtuous agent: such an agent has two connected capacities. She has the right concepts and the correct grasp of concepts to think about situations in which she finds herself by coming to moral beliefs. Secondly, for such a person such moral beliefs are automatically over-riding over other reasons she may have and in a particular way: they "silence" other reasons, as McDowell puts it. He believes that this is the best way to capture the traditional idea that moral reasons are specially authoritative.

McDowell rejects the Humean theory that every intentional action is the result of a combination of a belief and a desire, with the belief passively supplying a representation and the desire supplying the motivation. McDowell, following Thomas Nagel, holds that the virtuous agent's perception of the circumstances (i.e. her belief) justifies both the action and the desire. In order to understand the desire, we must understand the circumstances that the agent experienced and that compelled her to act. So, while the Humean thesis may be true about explanation, it is not true about the structure of justification— it should be replaced by Nagel's motivated desire theory.

Implicit in this account is a theory of the metaphysical status of values: moral agents form beliefs about the moral facts, which can be straightforwardly true or false. However, the facts themselves, like facts about colour experience, combine anthropocentricity with realism. Values are not there in the world for any observer, for example, one without our human interest in morality. However, in that sense, colours are not in the world either, but one cannot deny that colours are both present in our experience and needed for good explanations in our common sense understanding of the world. The test for the reality of a property is whether it is used in judgements for which there are developed standards of rational argument and whether they are needed to explain aspects of our experience that are otherwise inexplicable. McDowell thinks that moral properties pass both of these tests. There are established standards of rational argument and moral properties fall into the general class of those properties that are both anthropocentric but real.

The connection between McDowell's general metaphysics and this particular claim about moral properties is that all claims about objectivity are to be made from the internal perspective of our actual practices, the part of his view that he takes from the later Wittgenstein. There is no standpoint from outside our best theories of thought and language from which we can classify secondary properties as "second grade" or "less real" than the properties described, for example, by a mature science such as physics. Characterising the place of values in our worldview is not, in McDowell's view, to downgrade them as less real than talk of quarks or the Higgs boson.

=== Later work: Mind and World (1994) ===
McDowell's later work reflects the influence of G. W. F. Hegel, P. F. Strawson, Robert Brandom, Richard Rorty, and Wilfrid Sellars; both Mind and World and the Woodbridge lectures focus on a broadly Kantian understanding of intentionality (the mind's capacity to represent). Influenced by Sellars's famous diagnosis of the "Myth of the Given" in traditional empiricism, (Note: In brief, Sellars argues that the world merely causally affecting a being fails to supply rational justification for its beliefs, as only something that involves the use of concepts can serve as a reason for holding a belief.) McDowell's goal in Mind and World is to explain how we are passive in our perceptual experience of the world but active in conceptualizing it. In his account, he tries to avoid any connection with idealism, and develops an account of what Kant called the "spontaneity" of our judgement in perceptual experience.

Mind and World rejects a reductively naturalistic account: what McDowell calls "bald naturalism." He contrasts this with his own "naturalistic" perspective in which the distinctive capacities of mind are a cultural achievement of our "second nature", an idea that he adapts from Gadamer. The book concludes with a critique of Quine's narrow conception of empirical experience and also a critique of Donald Davidson's view of beliefs as being answerable only to other beliefs, in which Davidson plays the role of the pure coherentist.

In his later work, McDowell denies that there is any philosophical use for the idea of nonconceptual content— the idea that our experience contains representations that are not conceptually structured. Starting with a careful reading of Sellars's Empiricism and the Philosophy of Mind, he argues that we need to separate the use of concepts in experience from a causal account of the preconditions of experience. He argues that the idea of "nonconceptual content" is philosophically unacceptable because it straddles the boundary between these two. This denial of nonconceptual content has provoked considerable discussion because other philosophers have claimed that scientific accounts of our mental lives (particularly in cognitive science) need this idea.

While Mind and World represents an important contemporary development of a Kantian approach to philosophy of mind and metaphysics, one or two of the uncharitable interpretations of Kant's work in that book receive important revisions in McDowell's later Woodbridge Lectures, published in the Journal of Philosophy, Vol. 95, 1998, pp. 431–491. Those lectures are explicitly about Wilfrid Sellars, and assess whether or not Sellars lived up to his own critical principles in developing his interpretation of Kant (McDowell claims not). McDowell has, since the publication of Mind and World, largely continued to reiterate his distinctive positions that go against the grain of much contemporary work on language, mind, and value, particularly in North America where the influence of Wittgenstein has significantly waned.

=== Influences ===
McDowell's work has been heavily influenced by, among others, Aristotle, Immanuel Kant, G. W. F. Hegel, Karl Marx, John Cook Wilson, Ludwig Wittgenstein, Hans-Georg Gadamer, Philippa Foot, Elizabeth Anscombe, P. F. Strawson, Iris Murdoch, David Wiggins, and, especially in the case of his later work, Wilfrid Sellars. Many of the central themes in McDowell's work have also been pursued in similar ways by his Pittsburgh colleague Robert Brandom (though McDowell has stated strong disagreement with some of Brandom's readings and appropriations of his work). Both have been influenced by Richard Rorty, in particular Rorty's Philosophy and the Mirror of Nature (1979). In the preface to Mind and World (pp. ix–x) McDowell states that "it will be obvious that Rorty's work is [...] central for the way I define my stance here."

== Publications ==
=== Books ===
- Plato, Theaetetus, translated with notes (Clarendon Press, Oxford, 1973)
- (Editor) Gareth Evans, The Varieties of Reference (Clarendon Press, Oxford, 1982)
- Mind and World (Cambridge, Mass.: Harvard University Press, 1994)
- Mind, Value, and Reality (Cambridge, Mass.: Harvard University Press, 1998)
- Meaning, Knowledge, and Reality (Cambridge, Massachusetts: Harvard University Press, 1998)
- Having the World in View: Essays on Kant, Hegel, and Sellars (Cambridge, Massachusetts: Harvard University Press, 2009)
- The Engaged Intellect: Philosophical Essays (Cambridge, Massachusetts: Harvard University Press, 2009)

=== Selected articles ===
- (with Gareth Evans) "Introduction", in Gareth Evans and John McDowell, eds., Truth and Meaning (Clarendon Press, Oxford, 1976), pp. vii–xxiii; translated into Spanish: "Introducción a Verdad y Significado", Cuadernos de Crítica 37 (1984)
- "Truth Conditions, Bivalence, and Verificationism", ibid, pp. 42–66
- "On the Sense and Reference of a Proper Name", Mind lxxxvi (1977), 159–85; reprinted in Mark Platts, ed., Reference, Truth and Reality (Routledge and Kegan Paul, London, 1980), pp. 141–66, and in A. W. Moore, ed., Meaning and Reference (Oxford University Press, Oxford, 1993), pp. 111–36; translated into Spanish: "Sobre el Sentido y la Referencia de un Nombre Propio", Cuadernos de Crítica 20 (1983)
- "On 'The Reality of the Past'", in Christopher Hookway and Philip Pettit, eds., Action and Interpretation (CUP, Cambridge,1978), pp. 127–44
- "Are Moral Requirements Hypothetical Imperatives?", Aristotelian Society Supplementary Volume lii (1978), 13–29
- "Physicalism and Primitive Denotation", Erkenntnis xiii (1978), 131–52; reprinted in Platts, ed., op. cit., pp. 111–30
- "Virtue and Reason", The Monist lxii (1979), 331–50; reprinted in Stanley G. Clarke and Evan Simpson, eds., Anti-Theory in Ethics and Moral Conservatism (SUNY Press, Albany, 1989), pp. 87–109
- "Quotation and Saying That", in Platts, ed., op. cit., pp. 206–37
- "Meaning, Communication, and Knowledge", in Zak van Straaten, ed., Philosophical Subjects: Essays on the Work of P. F. Strawson (Clarendon Press, Oxford, 1980), pp. 117–39
- "The Role of Eudaimonia in Aristotle's Ethics", Proceedings of the African Classical Associations xv (1980), 1–14; reprinted in Amélie Oksenberg Rorty, ed., Essays on Aristotle's Ethics (University of California Press, Berkeley, Los Angeles, London, 1980), pp. 359–76
- "Anti-Realism and the Epistemology of Understanding", in Herman Parret and Jacques Bouveresse, eds., Meaning and Understanding (De Gruyter, Berlin and New York, 1981), pp. 225–48
- "Non-Cognitivism and Rule-Following", in Steven Holtzman and Christopher Leich, eds., Wittgenstein: To Follow A Rule (Routledge and Kegan Paul, London, 1981), pp. 141–62
- "Falsehood and Not-Being in Plato's Sophist", in Malcolm Schofield and Martha Craven Nussbaum, eds., Language and Logos: Studies in Ancient Greek Philosophy presented to G. E. L. Owen (Cambridge University Press, Cambridge, 1982), pp. 115–34
- "Truth-Value Gaps", in Logic, Methodology and Philosophy of Science VI (North-Holland, Amsterdam, 1982), pp. 299–313
- "Criteria, Defeasibility, and Knowledge", Proceedings of the British Academy lxviii (1982), 455–79; reprinted in part in Jonathan Dancy, ed., Perceptual Knowledge (Oxford University Press, Oxford, 1988)
- "Aesthetic Value, Objectivity, and the Fabric of the World", in Eva Schaper, ed., Pleasure, Preference and Value (Cambridge University Press, Cambridge, 1983), pp. 1–16
- "Wittgenstein on Following a Rule", Synthese 58 (1984), 325–363; reprinted in Moore, ed., Meaning and Reference, pp. 257–93
- "De Re Senses", Philosophical Quarterly xxxiv (1984), 283–94; also in Crispin Wright, ed., Frege: Tradition and Influence (Blackwell, Oxford, 1984), pp. 98–109
- "Values and Secondary Qualities", in Ted Honderich, ed., Morality and Objectivity (Routledge and Kegan Paul, London, 1985), pp. 110–29
- "In Defence of Modesty", in Barry Taylor, ed., Michael Dummett: Contributions to Philosophy (Martinus Nijhoff, Dordrecht, 1987), pp. 59–80
- Projection and Truth in Ethics (1987 Lindley Lecture), published by the University of Kansas
- "One Strand in the Private Language Argument", Grazer Philosophische Studien 33/34 (1989), 285–303
- "Mathematical Platonism and Dummettian Anti-Realism", Dialectica 43 (1989), 173–92
- "Peacocke and Evans on Demonstrative Content", Mind xcix (1990), 311–22
- "Intentionality De Re", in Ernest LePore and Robert van Gulick, eds. John Searle and His Critics (Blackwell, Oxford, 1991), pp. 215–25
- "Intentionality and Interiority in Wittgenstein", in Klaus Puhl, ed., Meaning Scepticism (De Gruyter, Berlin and New York, 1991), pp. 148–69
- "Putnam on Mind and Meaning", Philosophical Topics xx (1992), 35–48
- "Meaning and Intentionality in Wittgenstein's Later Philosophy", in Peter A. French, Theodore E. Uehling, Jr., and Howard K. Wettstein, eds., Midwest Studies in Philosophy Volume XVII: The Wittgenstein Legacy (University of Notre Dame Press, Notre Dame, 1992), pp. 40–52
- "Knowledge by Hearsay", in B. K. Matilal and A. Chakrabarti, eds, Knowing from Words (Kluwer, Dordrecht, 1993; Synthese Library vol. 230), pp. 195–224
- "The Content of Perceptual Experience", Philosophical Quarterly xliv (1994), 190–205
- "Might there be External Reasons", in J. E. J. Altham and Ross Harrison, eds., World, Mind, and Ethics: Essays on the Ethical Philosophy of Bernard Williams (Cambridge University Press, Cambridge, 1995), pp. 68–85
- "Eudaimonism and Realism in Aristotle's Ethics", in Robert Heinaman, ed., Aristotle and Moral Realism (University College London Press, London, 1995), pp. 201–18
- "Knowledge and the Internal", Philosophy and Phenomenological Research lv (1995), 877–93
- "Deliberation and Moral Development in Aristotle", in Stephen Engstrom and Jennifer Whiting, eds., Aristotle, Kant and the Stoics (Cambridge University Press, Cambridge, 1996), pp. 19–35
- "Two Sorts of Naturalism", in Rosalind Hursthouse, Gavin Lawrence, and Warren Quinn, eds., Virtues and Reasons: Philippa Foot and Moral Theory (Clarendon Press, Oxford, 1996), pp. 149–79; translated into German ("Zwei Arten von Naturalismus"), Deutsche Zeitschrift für Philosophie v (1997), 687–710
- "Another Plea for Modesty", in Richard Heck, Jnr., ed., Language, Thought, and Logic: Essays in Honour of Michael Dummett (Oxford University Press, Oxford, 1997), pp. 105–29
- "Reductionism and the First Person", in Jonathan Dancy, ed., Reading Parfit (Blackwell, Oxford, 1997), pp. 230–50
- "Some Issues in Aristotle's Moral Psychology", in Stephen Everson, ed., Companions to Ancient Thought: 4: Ethics (Cambridge University Press, Cambridge, 1998), pp. 107–28
- "Referring to Oneself", in Lewis E. Hahn, ed., The Philosophy of P. F. Strawson (Open Court, Chicago and Lasalle, 1998), pp. 129–45
- "The Constitutive Ideal of Rationality: Davidson and Sellars", Crítica xxx (1998), 29–48
- "Having the World in View: Sellars, Kant, and Intentionality" (The Woodbridge Lectures, 1997), The Journal of Philosophy, Vol. 95 (1998), 431–91
- "Sellars's Transcendental Empiricism", in Julian Nida-Rümelin, ed., Rationality, Realism, Revision (Proceedings of the 3rd international congress of the Society for Analytical Philosophy), Walter de Gruyter, Berlin and New York, 1999, pp. 42–51.
- "Scheme-Content Dualism and Empiricism", in Lewis E. Hahn, ed., The Philosophy of Donald Davidson (Open Court, Chicago and Lasalle, 1999), pp. 87–104
- "Towards Rehabilitating Objectivity", in Robert B. Brandom, ed., Rorty and His Critics (Blackwell, Malden, Mass. and Oxford, 2000), pp. 109–23
- "Experiencing the World" and "Responses", in Marcus Willaschek, ed., John McDowell: Reason and Nature: Lecture and Colloquium in Münster 1999 (LIT Verlag, Münster, 2000), pp. 3–17, 93–117
- "Moderne Auffassungen von Wissenschaft und die Philosophie des Geistes", in Johannes Fried und Johannes Süßmann, ed., Revolutionen des Wissens: Von der Steinzeit bis zur Moderne (Munich: C. H. Beck, 2001), 116–35. (Previously published in Philosophische Rundschau.)
- "Gadamer and Davidson on Understanding and Relativism", in Jeff Malpas, Ulrich Arnswald, and Jens Kertscher, eds., Gadamer's Century: Essays in Honor of Hans-Georg Gadamer (Cambridge, Massachusetts: MIT Press, 2002), 173–94.
- "How not to read Philosophical Investigations: Brandom's Wittgenstein", in R. Haller and K. Puhl, eds., Wittgenstein and the Future of Philosophy: A Reassessment after 50 Years (Vienna: Holder, Pichler, Tempsky, 2002), pp. 245–56.
- "Knowledge and the Internal Revisited", Philosophy and Phenomenological Research lxiv (2002), 97–105.
- Wert und Wirklichkeit: Aufsätze zur Moralphilosophie (Frankfurt: Suhrkamp, 2002). (Translation by Joachim Schulte, with an Introduction by Axel Honneth and Martin Seel, of seven of the papers in his Mind, Value, and Reality.)
- "Hyperbatologikos empeirismos", Defkalion 21/1, June 2003, 65–90. (Translation into Greek of "Transcendental Empiricism", paper delivered at the Pitt/Athens symposium in Rethymnon, Crete, in 2000.)
- "Subjective, intersubjective, objective", Philosophy and Phenomenological Research lxvii (2003), 675–81. (Contribution to a symposium on a book by Donald Davidson.)
- Mente y Mundo (Spanish translation by Miguel Ángel Quintana-Paz of Mind and World), Salamanca: Ediciones Sígueme, 2003.
- "L'idealismo di Hegel come radicalizazzione di Kant", in Luigi Ruggiu and Italo Testa, eds., Hegel Contemporaneo: la ricezione americana di Hegel a confronto con la traduzione europea (Milan: Guerini, 2003). (Previously in Iride for December 2001.)
- "Naturalism in the philosophy of mind", in Mario de Caro and David Macarthur, eds., Naturalism in Question (Cambridge, Massachusetts: Harvard University Press, 2004), 91–105. (Previously published in German translation as "Moderne Auffassungen von Wissenschaft und die Philosophie des Geistes", see above.)
- "Reality and colours: comment on Stroud", Philosophy and Phenomenological Research lxviii (2004), 395–400. (Contribution to a symposium on a book by Barry Stroud.)
- "The apperceptive I and the empirical self: towards a heterodox reading of 'Lordship and Bondage' in Hegel's Phenomenology", Bulletin of the Hegel Society of Great Britain 47/48, 2003, 1–16.
- "Hegel and the Myth of the Given", in Wolfgang Welsch und Klaus Vieweg, Herausg., Das Interesse des Denkens: Hegel aus heutiger Sicht (München: Wilhelm Fink Verlag, 2003), pp. 75–88.
