= Alice Crary =

American philosopher

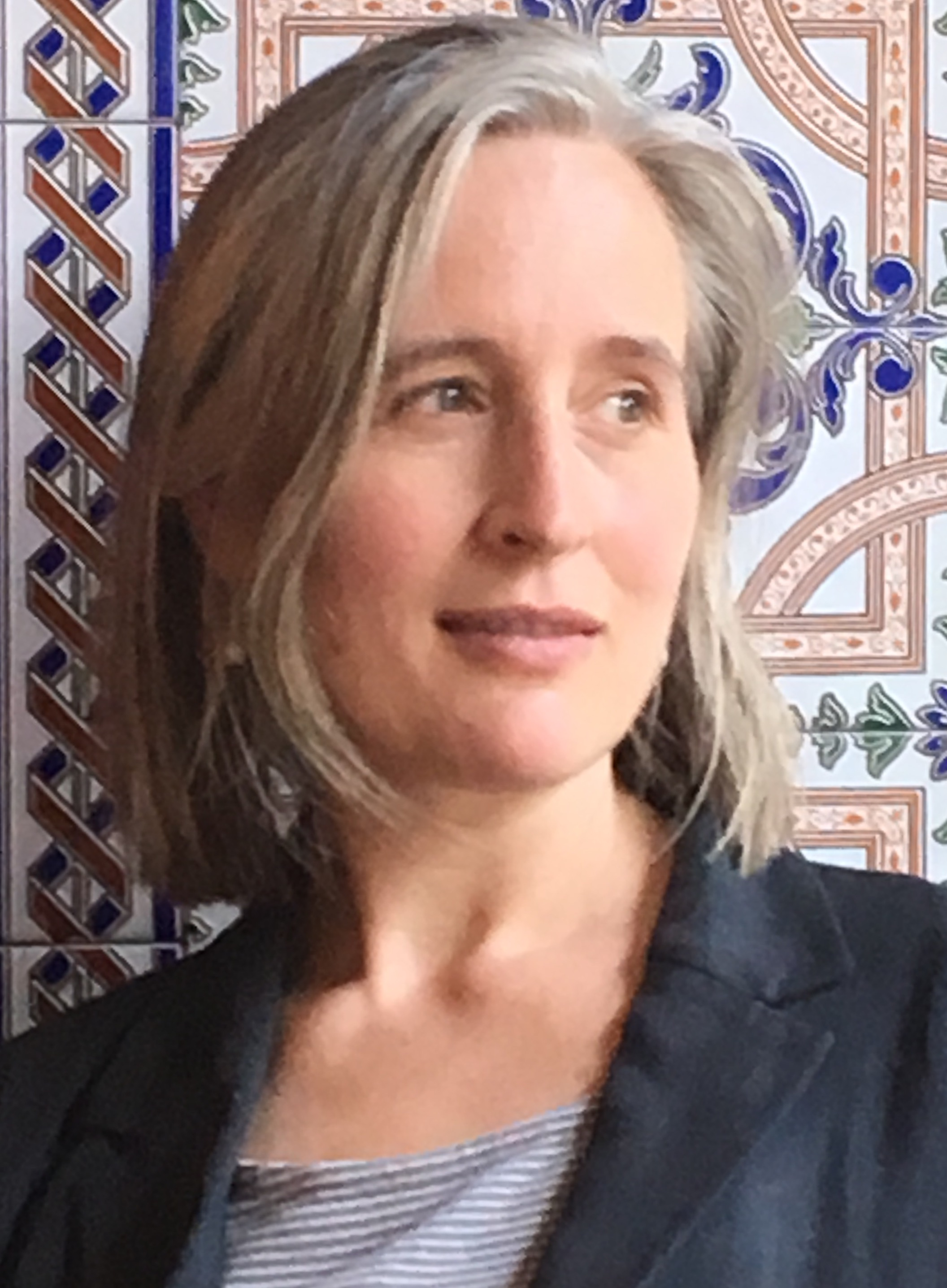
- Crary in 2017
- Born: Alice Marguerite Crary; 1967 (age 58–59); Seattle, Washington, U.S.

Education
- Education: Harvard University (BA); University of Pittsburgh (PhD)
- Doctoral advisor: John McDowell
- Other advisors: Stanley Cavell, Hilary Putnam

Philosophical work
- Era: Contemporary philosophy
- Region: Western philosophy
- School: Analytic; ordinary language philosophy
- Institutions: The New School; University of Oxford
- Main interests: Moral philosophy, philosophy and literature, epistemology, feminist philosophy, feminist epistemology, animal ethics, disability studies, objectivity
- Notable ideas: Wide "view" of objectivity

Alice Marguerite Crary (/ˈkrɛəri/; born 1967) is an American philosopher. She is Walter A. Eberstadt University Distinguished Professor in Philosophy at The New School for Social Research.

== Early life and education ==
Alice Marguerite Crary was born in 1967 in Seattle, Washington. During high school, she was a national champion rower at the Lakeside School (Seattle) in Seattle, Washington, and competed internationally and placed 6th in the Junior Women's Eight at the 1985 World Rowing Junior Championships in Brandenburg, Germany.

Later in the 1980s, after studying liberation theology with Harvey Cox at Harvard Divinity School, Crary researched Christian base communities in southern Mexico and Guatemala.

In the early 1990s, she was a teacher at the Colegio Americano in Quito, Ecuador. Crary earned her PhD in philosophy from the University of Pittsburgh in 1999.

== Career ==
Crary is a distinguished university professor at the Graduate Faculty of The New School for Social Research in New York City and visiting fellow at Regent's Park College, Oxford (where she was professor of philosophy 2018–19). She held visiting fellowships at All Souls College, Oxford (2021–22), and the Institute for Advanced Study, School of Social Sciences (2017–18).

Crary frequently participates in and organizes events for public discussion, such as public debates on the valuation of life and the treatment of animals and the cognitively disabled. She has also written for the New York Times.

=== Ethics and moral philosophy ===
Crary's first monograph, Beyond Moral Judgment, discusses how literature and feminism help to reframe moral presuppositions. Her Inside Ethics argues that ethics in disability studies and animal studies is stunted by a lack of moral imagination, caused by a narrow understanding of rationality and by a philosophy severed from literature and art. Crary has promoted the view that humans and animals have moral worth above and beyond any quantitative valuation.

=== Feminism and epistemology ===
Crary's work on feminism is critical of standard views of objectivity in analytic philosophy and post-structuralism. Drawing on Wittgenstein and feminist theory, Crary rejects the view that objectivity is value-neutral, and thus incompatible with ethical and political perspectives. According to Crary, these "ethically-loaded perspectives" invite both cognitive and ethical appreciation for the lives of women, in ways that count as objective knowledge. Like her moral philosophy, her feminist conception of objectivity is informed by Wittgenstein, who she understands as proposing a "wide" view of objectivity: one in which affective responses are not merely non-cognitive persuasive manipulations but reveal real forms of suffering that give us a more objective understanding of the world.

=== Wittgenstein ===
Crary is associated with the so-called "therapeutic" or "resolute" reading of Wittgenstein. She co-edited a collection of essays of such readings, The New Wittgenstein, where her own contribution argues against the standard use-theory readings of Wittgenstein that often render his thought as politically conservative and implausible. She has contributed to collections of Wittgenstein scholarship, including interpretations of Wittgenstein's On Certainty.

== Selected works ==
=== Publications ===
- Tholoniat, Yann (2023). "Alice Crary & Lori Gruen. Animal Crisis. A New Critical Theory. Cambridge, Polity Press, 2022, 136 p." Pratiques. 199–200. doi:10.4000/pratiques.14253. ISSN 0338-2389.
- Inside Ethics: On the Demands of Moral Thought, Harvard University Press, 2016-12-31, pp. i–vi
- "Moral Thought beyond Moral Judgment:", Beyond Moral Judgment, Harvard University Press, pp. 127–163, 2007
- Adams, Carol J.; Crary, Alice; Gruen, Lori, eds. (2023-02-23). "The Good It Promises, the Harm It Does". Oxford University Press. doi:10.1093/oso/9780197655696.001.0001.
- Read, Rupert; Crary, Alice (2016-02-17). Wittgenstein among the Sciences. Routledge. ISBN 978-1-134-77023-6.

=== Monographs ===
- Crary, Alice; Gruen, Lori (2022). Animal crisis: a new critical theory. Cambridge: Polity. ISBN 978-1-5095-4968-9.
- Crary, Alice (2016). Inside ethics: on the demands of moral thought. Cambridge: Harvard University Press. ISBN 978-0-674-96781-6.
- Crary, Alice (2009). Beyond moral judgment. Cambridge, Mass.: Harvard University Press. ISBN 978-0-674-03461-7.

=== Edited volumes ===
- Adams, Carol J.; Crary, Alice; Gruen, Lori. The good it promises, the harm it does: critical essays on effective altruism. Oxford: Oxford University Press. ISBN 978-0-19-765570-2.
- Cavell, Stanley; Bauer, Nancy; Crary, Alice; Laugier, Sandra (2022). Here and there: sites of philosophy. Cambridge (Mass.): Harvard University press. ISBN 978-0-674-27048-0.
- Diamond, Cora; Crary, Alice, eds. (2010). Wittgenstein and the moral life: essays in honor of Cora Diamond. Representation and mind. Cambridge, Mass: MIT Press. ISBN 978-0-262-27096-0.
- Crary, Alice; Shieh, Sanford (2006-04-18). Reading Cavell. Routledge. ISBN 978-1-134-28004-9.
- Crary, Alice; Read, Rupert J. (2000). The new Wittgenstein. London New York (N.Y.): Routledge. ISBN 978-0-415-17318-6.

== See also ==
- American philosophy
- List of American philosophers
- List of female philosophers
