= Definitions of philosophy =

Definitions of philosophy aim at determining what all forms of philosophy have in common and how to distinguish philosophy from other disciplines. Many different definitions have been proposed but there is very little agreement on which is the correct one. Some general characteristics of philosophy are widely accepted, for example, that it is a form of rational inquiry that is systematic, critical, and tends to reflect on its own methods. But such characteristics are usually too vague to give a proper definition of philosophy. Many of the more concrete definitions are very controversial, often because they are revisionary in that they deny the label philosophy to various subdisciplines for which it is normally used. Such definitions are usually only accepted by philosophers belonging to a specific philosophical movement. One reason for these difficulties is that the meaning of the term "philosophy" has changed throughout history: it used to include the sciences as its subdisciplines, which are seen as distinct disciplines in the modern discourse. But even in its contemporary usage, it is still a wide term spanning over many different subfields.

An important distinction among approaches to defining philosophy is between deflationism and essentialism. Deflationist approaches see it as an empty blanket term, while essentialistic approaches hold that there is a certain set of characteristic features shared by all parts of philosophy. Between these two extremes, it has been argued that these parts are related to each other by family resemblance even though they do not all share the same characteristic features. Some approaches try to define philosophy based on its method by emphasizing its use of pure reasoning instead of empirical evidence. Others focus on the wideness of its topic, either in the sense that it includes almost every field or based on the idea that it is concerned with the world as a whole or the big questions. These two approaches may also be combined to give a more precise definition based both on method and on topic.

Many definitions of philosophy concentrate on its close relation to science. Some see it as a proper science itself, focusing, for example, on the essences of things and not on empirical matters of fact, in contrast to most other sciences, or on its level of abstractness by talking about very wide-ranging empirical patterns instead of particular observations. But since philosophy seems to lack the progress found in regular sciences, various theorists have opted for a weaker definition by seeing philosophy as an immature science that has not yet found its sure footing. This position is able to explain both the lack of progress and the fact that various sciences used to belong to philosophy, while they were still in their provisional stages. It has the disadvantage of degrading philosophical practice in relation to the sciences.

Other approaches see philosophy more in contrast to the sciences as concerned mainly with meaning, understanding, or the clarification of language. This can take the form of the analysis of language and how it relates to the world, of finding the necessary and sufficient conditions for the applications of technical terms, as the task of identifying what pre-ontological understanding of the world we already have and which a priori conditions of possibility govern all experience, or as a form of therapy that tries to dispel illusions due to the confusing structure of natural language (therapeutic approach, e.g. quietism). An outlook on philosophy prevalent in the ancient discourse sees it as the love of wisdom expressed in the spiritual practice of developing one's reasoning ability in order to lead a better life. A closely related approach holds that the articulation of worldviews is the principal task of philosophy. Other conceptions emphasize the reflective nature of philosophy, for example, as thinking about thinking or as an openness to questioning any presupposition.

== General characteristics and sources of disagreement ==
The problem of defining philosophy concerns the question of what all forms of philosophy have in common, i.e. how philosophy differs from non-philosophy or other disciplines, such as the empirical sciences or fine art. One difficulty is due to the fact that the meaning of the term "philosophy" has changed a lot in history: it was used in a much wider sense to refer to any form of rational inquiry before the modern age. In this sense, it included many of the individual sciences and mathematics, which are not seen as part of philosophy today. For example, Isaac Newton's Philosophiæ Naturalis Principia Mathematica formulating the laws of classical mechanics carries the term in its title. Modern definitions of philosophy, as discussed in this article, tend to focus on how the term is used today, i.e. on a more narrow sense. Some basic characterizations of philosophy are widely accepted, like that it is a critical and mostly systematic study of a great range of areas. Other such characterizations include that it seeks to uncover fundamental truths in these areas using a reasoned approach while also reflecting on its own methods and standards of evidence. Such characterizations succeed at characterizing many or all parts of philosophy, which is a wide discipline spanning across many fields, as reflected in its sub-disciplines termed "philosophy of...", like the philosophy of science, of mind, of law, of religion, or of pornography. One difficulty for this type of approach is that it may include non-philosophical disciplines in its definition instead of distinguishing philosophy from them.

To overcome these difficulties, various more specific definitions of philosophy have been proposed. Most of them are controversial. In many cases, they are only accepted by philosophers belonging to one philosophical movement but not by others. The more general conceptions are sometimes referred to as descriptive conceptions in contrast to the more specific prescriptive conceptions. Descriptive conceptions try to give an account of how the term "philosophy" is actually used or what philosophers in the widest sense do. Prescriptive conceptions, on the other hand, aim at clarifying what philosophy ideally is or what it ought to be, even if what philosophers actually do often fall behind this ideal. This issue is particularly controversial since different philosophical movements often diverge widely in what they consider to be good philosophy. They are often revisionistic in the sense that many presumed parts of philosophy, past and present, would not deserve the title "philosophy" if they were true.

Some definitions of philosophy focus mainly on what the activity of doing philosophy is like, such as striving towards knowledge. Others concentrate more on the theories and systems arrived at this way. In this sense, the terms "philosophy" and "philosophical" can apply both to a thought process, to the results of this activity in the form of theories, or even to contemplative forms of life reflecting such theories. Another common approach is to define philosophy in relation to the task or goal it seeks to accomplish such as answering certain types of questions or arriving at a certain type of knowledge.

The difficulty in defining "philosophy" is also reflected in the fact that introductions to philosophy often do not start with a precise definition but introduce it instead by providing an overview of its many branches and subfields, such as epistemology, ethics, logic, and metaphysics. The discipline known as metaphilosophy has as one of its main goals to clarify the nature of philosophy. Outside the academic context, the term "philosophy" is sometimes used in an unspecific sense referring to general ideas or guidelines, such as the business philosophy of a company, the leadership philosophy of an entrepreneur, or the teaching philosophy of a schoolmaster.

== Deflationism, essentialism, and family resemblance ==
An important distinction among definitions of philosophy is between deflationism and essentialism. The deflationist approach holds that philosophy is an empty blanket term. It is used for convenience by deans and librarians to group various forms of inquiry together. This approach is usually motivated by the enduring difficulties in giving a satisfying definition. According to this view, philosophy does not have a precise essence shared by all its manifestations. One difficulty with the deflationist approach is that it is not helpful for solving disagreements on whether a certain new theory or activity qualifies as philosophy since this would seem to be just a matter of convention. Another is that it implies that the term "philosophy" is rather empty or meaningless.

This approach is opposed by essentialists, who contend that a set of features constitutes the essence of philosophy and characterizes all and only its parts. Many of the definitions based on subject matter, method, its relation to science or to meaning and understanding are essentialists conceptions of philosophy. They are controversial since they often exclude various theories and activities usually treated as part of philosophy.

These difficulties with the deflationist and the essentialist approach have moved some philosophers towards a middle ground, according to which the different parts of philosophy are characterized by family resemblances. This means that the various parts of philosophy resemble each other by sharing several features. But different parts share different features with each other, i.e. they do not all share the same features. This approach can explain both that the term "philosophy" has some substance to it, i.e. that it is not just based on an empty convention, and that some parts of philosophy may differ a lot from each other, for example, that some parts are very similar to mathematics while others almost belong to the natural sciences and psychology. This approach has the disadvantage that it leaves the definition of philosophy vague, thereby making it difficult for the non-paradigmatic cases to determine whether they belong to philosophy or not, i.e. that there is no clear-cut distinction.

== Based on method and subject matter ==
Two important aspects for distinguishing philosophy from other disciplines have been its topic or domain of inquiry and its method. The problem with these approaches is usually that they are either too wide, i.e. they include various other disciplines, like empirical sciences or fine arts, in their definition, or too narrow by excluding various parts of philosophy. Some have argued that its method focuses on a priori knowledge, i.e. that philosophy does not depend on empirical observations and experiments. Instead, such an approach bases philosophical justification primarily on pure reasoning, similar to how mathematical theory-making is based on mathematical proofs and in contrast to the scientific method based on empirical evidence. This way of doing philosophy is often referred to as armchair philosophy or armchair theorizing since it can be done from the comfort of one's armchair without any field work. But this characterization by itself is not sufficient as a definition, since it applies equally well to other fields, such as mathematics. Giving a more precise account of the method, for example, as conceptual analysis or phenomenological inquiry, on the other hand, results in a too narrow definition that excludes various parts of philosophy.

Definitions focusing on the domain of inquiry or topic of philosophy often emphasize its wide scope in contrast to the individual sciences. According to Wilfrid Sellars, for example, philosophy aims "to understand how things in the broadest possible sense of the term hang together in the broadest possible sense of the term". Similar definitions focus on how philosophy is concerned with the whole of the universe or at least with the big questions regarding life and the world. Such attempts usually result in a definition that is too broad and may include both some natural sciences and some forms of fine art and literature in it. On the other hand, they may also be too narrow, since some philosophical topics concern very specific questions that do not directly deal with the big questions or the world as a whole.

Because of these difficulties, philosophers have often tried to combine methodological and topical characterizations in their definitions. This can happen, for example, by emphasizing the wideness of its domain of inquiry, to distinguish it from the other individual sciences, together with its rational method, to distinguish it from fine art and literature. Such approaches are usually more successful at determining the right extension of the term but they also do not fully solve this problem.

== Based on relation to science ==
Various definitions of philosophy emphasize its close relation to science, either by seeing it itself as a science or by characterizing the role it plays for science. The plausibility of such definitions is affected by how wide the term "science" is to be understood. If it refers to the natural sciences, such definitions are usually quite controversial. But if science is understood in a very wide sense as a form of rational inquiry that includes both the formal sciences and the humanities, such characterizations are less controversial but also less specific. This wide sense is how the term "philosophy" was traditionally used to cover various disciplines that are today considered as distinct disciplines. But this does not reflect its contemporary usage. Many science-based definitions of philosophy face the difficulty of explaining why philosophy has historically not shown the same level of progress as the sciences. Some reject this claim by emphasizing that philosophy has significantly progressed, but in a different and less obvious way. Others allow that this type of progress is not found in philosophy and try to find other explanations why it should still be considered a science.

=== As a proper science ===
The strongest relation to science is posited by definitions that see philosophy itself as a science. One such conception of philosophy is found within the phenomenological movement, which sees philosophy as a rigorous science. On this view, philosophy studies the structures of consciousness, more specifically, the essences that show themselves in consciousness and their relations to each other, independent of whether they have instances in the external world. It contrasts with other sciences in that they do not reflect on the essences themselves but research whether and in which ways these essences are manifested in the world. This position was already anticipated by Arthur Schopenhauer, who holds that philosophy is only interested in the nature of what there is but not in the causal relations explaining why it is there or what will become of it. But this science-based definition of philosophy found in phenomenology has come under attack on various points. On the one hand, it does not seem to be as rigorously scientific as its proponents proclaim. This is reflected in the fact that even within the phenomenological movement, there are still various fundamental disagreements that the phenomenological method has not been able to resolve, suggesting that philosophy has not yet found a solid epistemological footing. On the other hand, different forms of philosophy study various other topics besides essences and the relations between them.

Another conception of philosophy as a science is due to Willard Van Orman Quine. His outlook is based on the idea that there are no analytic propositions, i.e. that any claim may be revised based on new experiences. On this view, both philosophy and mathematics are empirical sciences. They differ from other sciences in that they are more abstract by being concerned with wide-reaching empirical patterns instead of particular empirical observations. But this distance to individual observations does not mean that their claims are non-empirical, according to Quine. A similar outlook in the contemporary discourse is sometimes found in experimental philosophers, who reject the exclusive armchair approach and try to base their theories on experiments.

Seeing philosophy as a proper science is often paired with the claim that philosophy has just recently reached this status, for example, due to the discovery of a new philosophical methodology. Such a view can explain that philosophy is a science despite not having made much progress: because it has had much less time in comparison to the other sciences.

=== As an immature science ===
But a more common approach is to see philosophy not as a fully developed science on its own but as an immature or preliminary science. Georg Simmel, for example, sees it as a provisional science studying appearances. On this view, a field of inquiry belongs to philosophy until it has developed sufficiently to provide exact knowledge of the real elements underlying these appearances. Karl Jaspers gives a similar characterization by emphasizing the deep disagreements within philosophy in contrast to the sciences, which have achieved the status of generally accepted knowledge. This is often connected to the idea that philosophy does not have a clearly demarcated domain of inquiry, in contrast to the individual sciences: the demarcation only happens once a philosophical subdiscipline has reached its full maturity.

This approach has the advantage of explaining both the lack of progress in philosophy and the fact that many sciences used to be part of philosophy before they matured enough to constitute fully developed sciences. But the parts that still belong to philosophy have so far failed to reach a sufficient consensus on their fundamental theories and methods. A philosophical discipline ceases to be philosophy and becomes a science once definite knowledge of its topic is possible. In this sense, philosophy is the midwife of the sciences. Philosophy itself makes no progress because the newly created science takes all the credit. On such a view, it is even conceivable that philosophy ceases to exist at some point once all its sub-disciplines have been turned into sciences. An important disadvantage of this view is that it has difficulty in accounting for the seriousness and the importance of the achievements of philosophers, including the ones affecting the sciences. The reason for this is that labeling philosophy as an immature science implies that philosophers are unable to go about their research in the proper manner. Another disadvantage of this conception is that the closeness to science does not fit equally well for all parts of philosophy, especially in relation to moral and political philosophy. Some even hold that philosophy as a whole may never outgrow its immature status since humans lack the cognitive faculties to give answers based on solid evidence to the philosophical questions they are considering. If this view were true, it would have the serious consequence that doing philosophy would be downright pointless.

== Based on meaning, understanding, and clarification ==
Many definitions of philosophy see as its main task the creation of meaning and understanding or the clarification of concepts. In this sense, philosophy is often contrasted with the sciences in the sense that it is not so much about what the actual world is like but about how we experience it or how we think and talk about it. This may be expressed by stating that philosophy is "the pursuit not of knowledge but of understanding". In some cases, this takes the form of making various practices and assumptions explicit that have been implicit before, similar to how a grammar makes the rules of a language explicit without inventing them. This is a form of reflective, second-order understanding that can be applied to various fields, not just the sciences.

A conception of philosophy based on clarification and meaning is defended by logical positivists, who saw the "clarification of problems and assertions" as the main task of philosophy. According to Moritz Schlick, for example, philosophy is unlike the sciences in that it does not aim at establishing a system of true propositions. Instead, it is the activity of finding meaning. But this activity is nonetheless quite relevant for the sciences since familiarity with the meaning of a proposition is important for assessing whether it is true. A closely related definition is given by Rudolf Carnap, who sees philosophy as the logic of science, meaning that it is concerned with analyzing scientific concepts and theories. From the perspective of logical atomism, this clarification takes the form of decomposing propositions into basic elements, which are then correlated to the entities found in the world. On this approach, philosophy has both a destructive and a constructive side. Its destructive side focuses on eliminating meaningless statements that are neither verifiable by experience nor true by definition. This position is often connected to the idea that some sentences, such as metaphysical, ethical, or aesthetical sentences, lack a meaning since they cannot be correlated to elements in the world that determine whether they are true or false. In this sense, philosophy can be understood as a critique of language that exposes senseless expressions. Its constructive side, on the other hand, concerns epistemology and philosophy of science, often with the goal of finding a unified science.

Other conceptions of philosophy agree that it has to do with finding meaning and clarifying concepts but focus on a wider domain beyond the sciences. For example, a conception commonly found in the analytic tradition equates philosophy with conceptual analysis. In this sense, philosophy has as its main task to clarify the meanings of the terms we use, often in the form of searching for the necessary and sufficient conditions under which a concept applies to something. Such an analysis is not interested in whether any actual entity falls under this concept. For example, a physicist may study what causes a certain event to happen while a philosopher may study what we mean when using the term "causation". This analysis may be applied to scientific terms but is not limited to them.

From the perspective of ordinary language philosophy, philosophy has as its main enterprise the analysis of natural language. According to Ludwig Wittgenstein, for example, philosophy is not a theory but a practice that takes the form of linguistic therapy. This therapy is important because ordinary language is structured in confusing ways that make us susceptible to all kinds of misunderstandings. It is the task of the philosopher to uncover the root causes of such illusions. This often takes the form of exposing how traditional philosophical "problems" are only pseudo-problems, thereby dissolving them rather than resolving them. So on a theoretical level, philosophy leaves everything as it is without trying to provide new insights, explanations, or deductions.

The focus on understanding is also reflected in the transcendental traditions and in some strands of phenomenology, where the task of philosophy is identified with making comprehensible and articulating the understanding we already have of the world, sometimes referred to as pre-understanding or pre-ontological understanding. The need for such an inquiry is expressed in Saint Augustine's remark concerning the nature of time: "I know well enough what it is, provided that nobody asks me; but if I am asked what it is and try to explain, I am baffled". This type of understanding is prior to experience in the sense that experience of a particular thing is not possible without some form of pre-understanding of this thing. In this sense, philosophy is a transcendental inquiry into the a priori conditions of possibility underlying both ordinary and scientific experience. But characterizing philosophy this way seems to exclude many of its sub-disciplines, like applied ethics.

== Others ==
Various other definitions of philosophy have been proposed. Some focus on its role in helping the practitioner lead a good life: they see philosophy as the spiritual practice of developing one's reasoning ability through which some ideal of health is to be realized. Such an outlook on philosophy was already explicitly articulated in stoicism and has also been adopted by some contemporary philosophers. A closely related conception sees philosophy as a way of life. This is based on a conception of what it means to lead a good life that is centered on increasing one's wisdom through various types of spiritual exercises or on the development and usage of reason. Such an outlook can already be discerned in ancient Greek philosophy, where philosophy is often seen as the love of wisdom. According to this characterization, philosophy differs from wisdom itself since it implies more the continued struggle to attain wisdom, i.e. being on the way towards wisdom.

A closely related approach sees the principal task of philosophy as the development and articulation of worldviews. Worldviews are comprehensive representations of the world and our place in it. They go beyond science by articulating not just theoretical facts concerning the world but also include practical and ethical components, both on a general and a specific level. This way, worldviews articulate what matters in life and can guide people in living their lives accordingly. On the worldview account of philosophy, it is the task of philosophers to articulate such global visions both of how things on the grand scale hang together and which practical stance we should take towards them.

Other conceptions of philosophy focus on its reflective and metacognitive aspects. One way to emphasize the reflective nature of philosophy is to define it as thinking about thinking. Another characterization of philosophy sometimes found in the literature is that, at least in principle, it does not take any facts for granted and allows any presupposition to be questioned, including its own methods. This is reflected in the fact that philosophy has no solid foundations to build on since whatever foundations one philosopher accepts may be questioned by another. Sokrates identified philosophy with the awareness of one's ignorance. For Immanuel Kant, philosophical inquiry is characterized as "knowledge gained by reason from concepts" (Vernunfterkenntnis aus Begriffen). According to Georg Wilhelm Friedrich Hegel, philosophy is the science of reason.
