= Creath =

Creath is a surname. Notable people with the surname include:

- Charlie Creath (1890–1951), American jazz musician and bandleader
- Richard Creath (born 1947), American philosopher
