= Wilfrid Sellars =

American philosopher (1912–1989)

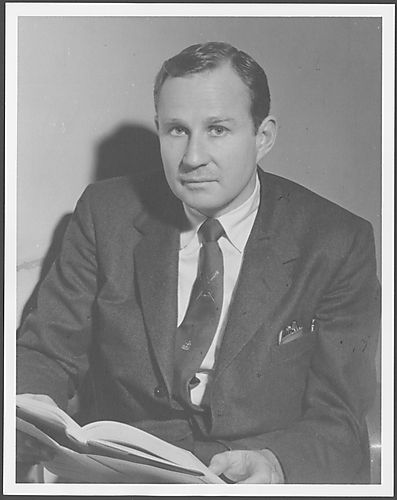
- Born: Wilfrid Stalker Sellars; May 20, 1912; Ann Arbor, Michigan, U.S.
- Died: July 2, 1989 (aged 77); Pittsburgh, Pennsylvania, U.S.

Education
- Education: University of Michigan (B.A., 1933); University at Buffalo (M.A., 1934); Oriel College, Oxford (B.A., 1936; M.A., 1940)
- Academic advisors: Marvin Farber; Thomas Dewar Weldon

Philosophical work
- Era: 20th-century philosophy
- Region: Western philosophy
- School: Analytic philosophy Pittsburgh school (analytic Hegelianism); Process philosophy Scientific realism Critical perceptual realism Anti-foundationalism
- Institutions: University of Pittsburgh
- Doctoral students: Héctor-Neri Castañeda; Paul Churchland; Richard Creath; Willem deVries; Christopher Gauker; Robert Kane; John Lachs; György Márkus; Ruth Millikan; Jay Rosenberg
- Notable students: Fred Dretske
- Main interests: Philosophy of mind Philosophy of perception Epistemology; Meaning; Pragmatism; Behaviorism; History of philosophy Expressivism
- Notable ideas: Criticism of foundationalist epistemology (the "Myth of the Given"); Psychological nominalism Kantian empiricism The distinction between the 'manifest' and the 'scientific' image Logical space of reasons (the realm of the semantic); Sellarsian dilemma for foundationalism Synoptic vision Rylean myth

Wilfrid Stalker Sellars (/ˈsɛlərz/; May 20, 1912 – July 2, 1989) was an American philosopher and prominent developer of scientific realism and critical perceptual realism who "revolutionized both the content and the method of philosophy in the United States". His work has had a profound impact in virtually all areas of analytic philosophy beginning in the latter half of the 20th century, including in epistemology, philosophy of language, philosophy of mind, philosophy of perception, and philosophy of science. His most notable contributions include his critique of foundationalist epistemology (the "Myth of the Given"), a synoptic philosophy aiming to unite what he called the manifest and scientific images, and an inferentialist account of meaning.

== Biography ==
=== Early life and education ===
Wilfrid was educated at the University of Michigan (BA, 1933), the University at Buffalo, and Oriel College, Oxford (1934–1937), where he was a Rhodes Scholar, obtaining his highest earned degree, an MA, in 1940.

=== World War II ===
During World War II, he served in military intelligence.

=== Professorship ===
He then taught at the University of Iowa (1938–1946), the University of Minnesota (1947–1958), and Yale University (1958–1963). He served as president of the Metaphysical Society of America in 1977. He was a founder of the journal Philosophical Studies.

=== Death ===
He taught at the University of Pittsburgh from 1963 until his death.

== Philosophy ==
Sellars is well known as a critic of foundationalist epistemology—the "Myth of the Given" as he called it. However, his philosophical works are more generally directed toward the ultimate goal of reconciling intuitive ways of describing the world (both those of common sense and traditional philosophy) with a thoroughly naturalist, scientific account of reality. He is widely regarded both for great sophistication of argument and for his assimilation of many and diverse subjects in pursuit of a synoptic vision. Sellars was perhaps the first philosopher to synthesize elements of American pragmatism with elements of British and American analytic philosophy and Austrian and German logical positivism. His work also reflects a sustained engagement with German idealism, most notably in his 1966 John Locke Lectures, published two years later as Science and Metaphysics: Variations on Kantian Themes.

Sellars coined certain now-common idioms in philosophy, such as the "space of reasons". This idiom refers to two things. It:

1. Describes the conceptual and behavioral web of language that humans use to get intelligently around their world,
2. Denotes the fact that talk of reasons, epistemic justification, and intention is not the same as, and cannot necessarily be mapped onto, talk of causes and effects in the sense that physical science speaks of them.

Note: (2) corresponds in part to the distinction Sellars makes between the manifest image and the scientific image.

=== "Empiricism and the Philosophy of Mind" ===
Sellars's most famous work is "Empiricism and the Philosophy of Mind" (1956). In it, he criticizes the view that perceptual knowledge can be independent of the conceptual capacities involved in perception. He named this "The Myth of the Given", attributing it to sense-data theories of knowledge.

The work targets several theories at once, especially C. I. Lewis' Kantian pragmatism and Rudolf Carnap's positivism. He draws out "The Myth of Jones" to defend the possibility of a strict behaviorist world-view. The parable explains how thoughts, intelligent action, and even subjective inner experience can be attributed to people within a scientific model. Sellars used a fictional tribe, the "Ryleans," since he wanted to address Gilbert Ryle's The Concept of Mind.

Sellars's idea of "myth", heavily influenced by Ernst Cassirer, is not necessarily negative. He saw it as something that can be useful or otherwise, rather than true or false. He aimed to unite the conceptual behavior of the "space of reasons" with the concept of a subjective sense experience. This was one of his most central goals, which his later work described as Kantian.

=== "The Language of Theories" ===
Sellars's account of scientific knowledge, developed in part in "The Language of Theories" (1961), has been characterized as a form of Kantian empiricism. Kantian empiricism features a distinction between (1) claims whose revision requires abandonment or modification of the system of concepts in terms of which they are framed (i.e., modification of the fallible set of constitutive principles underlying knowledge, otherwise known as framework-relative a priori truths) and (2) claims revisable on the basis of observations formulated in terms of a system of concepts which remained fixed throughout.

=== "Philosophy and the Scientific Image of Man" ===
In his "Philosophy and the Scientific Image of Man" (1962), Sellars distinguishes between the "manifest image" and the "scientific image" of the world. It also includes his famous quote about "the aim of philosophy, abstractly formulated," being "to understand how things, in the broadest possible sense of the term, hang together, in the broadest possible sense of the term."

The manifest image includes intentions, thoughts, and appearances. Sellars allows that the manifest image may be refined through 'correlational induction', but he rules out appeal to imperceptible entities.

The scientific image describes the world in terms of the theoretical physical sciences. It includes notions such as causality and theories about particles and forces.

The two images sometimes complement one another and sometimes conflict. For example, the manifest image includes practical or moral claims, whereas the scientific image does not. There is conflict, e.g. where science tells us that apparently solid objects are mostly empty space. Sellars favors a synoptic vision, wherein the scientific image takes ultimate precedence in cases of conflict, at least with respect to empirical descriptions and explanations.

=== "Meaning as Functional Classification" ===
In "Meaning as Functional Classification" (1974), Sellars elaborated upon a version of functional role semantics that he had previously defended in prior publications. For Sellars, thoughts are analogous to linguistic utterances, and both thoughts and linguistic utterances gain their content through token thoughts or utterances standing in certain relations with other thoughts, stimuli, and responses.

== Legacy ==
Robert Brandom, his junior colleague at Pittsburgh, named Sellars and Willard Van Orman Quine as the two most profound and important philosophers of their generation. Sellars's goal of a synoptic philosophy that unites the everyday and scientific views of reality is the foundation and archetype of what is sometimes called the Pittsburgh school, whose members include Brandom, John McDowell, and John Haugeland. Especially Brandom introduced a Hegelian variety of the Pittsburgh school, often called "analytic Hegelianism." Sellars himself viewed his work as moving analytic philosophy from its Humean (i.e. logical positivist) to its Kantian phase, and Richard Rorty suggested that Brandom's work continues that movement into its Hegelian phase.

Other philosophers strongly influenced by Sellars span the full spectrum of contemporary English-speaking philosophy, from neopragmatism (Rorty) to eliminative materialism (Paul Churchland) to rationalism (Laurence BonJour). Sellars's philosophical heirs also include Ruth Millikan, Daniel Dennett, Héctor-Neri Castañeda, Bruce Aune, Jay Rosenberg, Johanna Seibt, Matthew Burstein, Ray Brassier, Andrew Chrucky, Jeffrey Sicha, Pedro Amaral, Thomas Vinci, Willem A. de Vries, David Rosenthal, Ken Wilber and Michael Williams. Sellars's work has been drawn upon in feminist standpoint theory, for example in the work of Quill Kukla.

Sellars's death in 1989 was the result of long-term alcohol use. A collection of essays devoted to 'Sellars and his Legacy' was published by Oxford University Press in 2016 (James O'Shea, ed., Wilfrid Sellars and his Legacy), with contributions from Brandom, deVries, Kraut, Kukla, Lance, McDowell, Millikan, O'Shea, Rosenthal, Seibt, and Williams.

== Personal life ==
=== Family background ===
His father was the Canadian-American philosopher Roy Wood Sellars, a leading American philosophical naturalist in the first half of the twentieth-century.

=== Political views ===
The son of a socialist, Sellars was involved in left-wing politics. As a student at the University of Michigan, Wilfrid Sellars was one of the founding members of the first North-American cooperative house for university students, which was then called "Michigan Socialist House" (and which was later renamed "Michigan Cooperative House"). He also campaigned for the socialist candidate Norman Thomas of the Socialist Party of America.

== Bibliography ==
- Pure Pragmatics and Possible Worlds-The Early Essays of Wilfrid Sellars, [PPPW], ed. by Jeffrey F. Sicha, (Ridgeview Publishing Co; Atascadero, CA; 1980). [Contains a long introductory essay by Sicha and an extensive bibliography of Sellars's work through 1979.]
- Science, Perception and Reality, [SPR], (Routledge & Kegan Paul Ltd; London, and The Humanities Press: New York; 1963) [Reissued in 1991 by Ridgeview Publishing Co., Atascadero, CA. This edition contains a complete bibliography of Sellars's published work through 1989.]
- Philosophical Perspectives, [PP], (Charles C. Thomas: Springfield, IL; 1967). Reprinted in two volumes, Philosophical Perspectives: History of Philosophy and Philosophical Perspective: Metaphysics and Epistemology, (Ridgeview Publishing Co.; Atascadero, CA; 1977).
- Science and Metaphysics: Variations on Kantian Themes. [S&M], (Routledge & Kegan Paul Ltd; London, and The Humanities Press; New York; 1968). The 1966 John Locke Lectures. [Reissued in 1992 by Ridgeview Publishing Co., Atascadero, CA. This edition contains a complete bibliography of Sellars's published work through 1989, a register of Sellars's philosophical correspondence, and a listing of circulated but unpublished papers and lectures.]
- Essays in Philosophy and Its History, [EPH], (D. Reidel Publishing Co.; Dordrecht, Holland; 1975).
- Naturalism and Ontology, [N&O], (Ridgeview Publishing Co.; Atascadero, CA: 1979). [An expanded version of the 1974 John Dewey Lectures]
- The Metaphysics of Epistemology: Lectures by Wilfrid Sellars, edited by Pedro Amaral, (Ridgeview Publishing Co.; Atascadero, CA; 1989). [Contains a complete bibliography of Sellars's published work through 1989.]
- Empiricism and the Philosophy of Mind [EPM*], edited by Robert Brandom, (Harvard University Press; Cambridge, Massachusetts; 1997). [The original, 1956, version of [EPM] (see below), lacking footnotes added in [SPR], with an Introduction by Richard Rorty and Study Guide by Brandom.]
- Kant and Pre-Kantian Themes: Lectures by Wilfrid Sellars, edited by Pedro Amaral, (Ridgeview Publishing Co.; Atascadero, CA: 2002). [A transcription of Sellars's Kant lectures, plus essays on Descartes, Locke, Spinoza, and Leibniz.]
- Kant's Transcendental Metaphysics: Cassirer Lecture Notes and Other Essays, edited by Jeffrey F. Sicha (Ridgeview Publishing Co.; Atascadero, CA: 2002). [Contains a complete bibliography of Sellars's published work, philosophical correspondence, and circulated manuscripts through 2002.]

== See also ==
- American philosophy
- Definitions of philosophy
- List of American philosophers
- The Myth of the Framework
- Transcendental empiricism
