= Philosophical analysis =

Various techniques typically used by philosophers in the analytic tradition

Philosophical analysis is any of various techniques, typically used by philosophers in the analytic tradition, in order to "break down" (i.e. analyze) philosophical issues. Arguably the most prominent of these techniques is the analysis of concepts, known as conceptual analysis.

== Method of analysis ==
While analysis is characteristic of the analytic tradition in philosophy, what is to be analyzed (the analysandum) often varies. In their papers, philosophers may focus on different areas. One might analyze linguistic phenomena such as sentences, or psychological phenomena such as sense data. However, perhaps the most prominent type of analysis, referred to as conceptual analysis, focuses on concepts or propositions.

A.C. Ewing distinguished between two forms of philosophical analysis. The first is "what the persons who make a certain statement usually intend to assert" and the second "the qualities, relations and species of continuants mentioned in the statement". As an illustration he takes the statement "I see a tree", this statement could be analysed in terms what the everyday person intends what they say this or it could be analysed metaphysically by asserting representationalism.

Conceptual analysis consists primarily in breaking down or analyzing concepts into their constituent parts in order to gain knowledge or a better understanding of a particular philosophical issue in which the concept is involved. For example, the problem of free will in philosophy involves various key concepts, including the concepts of freedom, moral responsibility, determinism, ability, etc. The method of conceptual analysis tends to approach such a problem by breaking down the key concepts pertaining to the problem and seeing how they interact. Thus, in the long-standing debate on whether free will is compatible with the doctrine of determinism, several philosophers have proposed analyses of the relevant concepts to argue for either compatibilism or incompatibilism.

A famous example of conceptual analysis at its best is given by Bertrand Russell in his theory of descriptions. Russell attempted to analyze propositions that involved definite descriptions, which pick out a unique individual (such as "The tallest spy"), and indefinite descriptions, which pick out a set of individuals (such as "a spy"). In his analysis of definite descriptions, superficially, these descriptions have the standard subject-predicate form of a proposition: thus "The present king of France is bald" appears to be predicating "baldness" of the subject, "the present king of France". However, Russell noted that this is problematic, because there is no present king of France (France is no longer a monarchy). Normally, to decide whether a proposition of the standard subject-predicate form is true or false, one checks whether the subject is in the extension of the predicate. The proposition is then true if and only if the subject is in the extension of the predicate. The problem is that there is no present king of France, so the present king of France cannot be found on the list of bald things or non-bald things. So, it would appear that the proposition expressed by "The present king of France is bald" is neither true nor false. However, analyzing the relevant concepts and propositions, Russell proposed that what definite descriptions really express are not propositions of the subject-predicate form, but rather they express existentially quantified propositions. Thus, "The present king of France" is analyzed, according to Russell's theory of descriptions, as "There exists an individual who is currently the king of France, there is only one such individual, and that individual is bald." Now one can determine the truth value of the proposition. Indeed, it is false, because it is not the case that there exists a unique individual who is currently the king of France and is bald, since there is no present king of France.

== Criticism ==
While the method of analysis is characteristic of contemporary analytic philosophy, its status continues to be a source of great controversy even among analytic philosophers. Several current criticisms of the analytic method derive from W.V. Quine's famous rejection of the analytic–synthetic distinction. While Quine's critique is well-known, it is highly controversial.

Further, the analytic method seems to rely on some sort of definitional structure of concepts, so that one can give necessary and sufficient conditions for the application of the concept. For example, the concept "bachelor" is often analyzed as having the concepts "unmarried" and "male" as its components. Thus, the definition or analysis of "bachelor" is thought to be an unmarried male. But one might worry that these so-called necessary and sufficient conditions do not apply in every case. Wittgenstein, for instance, argues that language (e.g., the word 'bachelor') is used for various purposes and in an indefinite number of ways. Wittgenstein's famous thesis states that meaning is determined by use. This means that, in each case, the meaning of 'bachelor' is determined by its use in a context. So if it can be shown that the word means different things across different contexts of use, then cases where its meaning cannot be essentially defined as 'unmarried man' seem to constitute counterexamples to this method of analysis. This is just one example of a critique of the analytic method derived from a critique of definitions. There are several other such critiques. This criticism is often said to have originated primarily with Wittgenstein's Philosophical Investigations.

A third critique of the method of analysis derives primarily from psychological critiques of intuition. A key part of the analytic method involves analyzing concepts via "intuition tests". Philosophers tend to motivate various conceptual analyses by appeal to their intuitions about thought experiments.

In short, some philosophers feel strongly that the analytic method (especially conceptual analysis) is essential to and defines philosophy. Yet, some philosophers argue that the method of analysis is problematic. Some, however, take the middle ground and argue that while analysis is largely a fruitful method of inquiry, philosophers should not limit themselves to only using the method of analysis.

== See also ==
- Analytic philosophy
- Conceptual history
- Definitions of philosophy
- Philosophical methodology
- Sophist (dialogue)
- Statesman (dialogue)
- Thesis, antithesis, synthesis
