= Synoptic philosophy =

Blending and appreciation of wisdom in its totality

Synoptic philosophy comes from the Greek word συνοπτικός synoptikos ("seeing everything together") and together with the word philosophy, means the love of wisdom emerging from a coherent understanding of everything together.

James L. Christian's Philosophy: An Introduction to the Art of Wondering (1973) takes a unique synoptic approach: its author believes that philosophy is critical thinking about the "Big Picture". The goal of the book is not merely to introduce the history of formal thinking in western culture, but also to provide students with practical approaches and tools for dealing with some of the enduring questions as they manifest in everyday life.

The philosopher Wilfrid Sellars (1962) also uses the term synoptic vision.

== See also ==
- Interdisciplinarity
- New Historicism
- Social constructivism
- A Syntopicon
- Systems thinking
