= Definitionism =

School of thought

Definitionism (also called the classical theory of concepts) is the school of thought in which it is believed that a proper explanation of a theory consists of all the concepts used by that theory being well-defined. This approach has been criticized for its dismissal of the importance of ostensive definitions.
