= Jay Rosenberg =

American philosopher

Jay Frank Rosenberg (April 18, 1942, Chicago – February 21, 2008, Chapel Hill, North Carolina) was an American philosopher and historian of philosophy. He spent his teaching career at the University of North Carolina at Chapel Hill, where he joined the Department of Philosophy in 1966 and was appointed Taylor Grandy Professor of Philosophy in 1987. Rosenberg was a student of Wilfrid Sellars and established his reputation with ten books and over 80 articles in metaphysics, epistemology, the philosophy of language, and the history of philosophy (especially Immanuel Kant). His most commercially successful work, The Practice of Philosophy: A Handbook for Beginners, is a standard text in introductory philosophy courses, and has been translated into German.

He received a Guggenheim Fellowship, a fellowship from the National Endowment for the Humanities. He was a Fulbright senior research fellow at Bielefeld University, Germany and research fellow of the Center for Interdisciplinary Research in Bielefeld. Two of his students published a festschrift in his memory: James R. O'Shea and Eric M. Rubenstein, eds., Self, Language, and World: Problems from Kant, Sellars, and Rosenberg. (Atascadero, CA: Ridgeview, 2010 ISBN 0924922400)

== Biography ==
Rosenberg graduated from Evanston Township High School in 1959, and from Reed College in 1963, before earning his PhD from the University of Pittsburgh in 1966.

Rosenberg from his undergraduate days had an interest in cookery, folk-dancing, and popular culture. His first publication, The Impoverished Students' Book of Cookery, Drinkery, and Housekeepery!, written while an undergraduate at Reed, has since been republished and is available from the Reed College bookstore. Proceeds go to a scholarship fund. In 1966, Rosenberg appeared as himself on the May 9, 1966 episode of To Tell The Truth where he was introduced, along with two imposters as the author The Impoverished Students' Book of Cookery, Drinkery, and Housekeepery!. Tom Poston was the only panelist to correctly identify Rosenberg. At the urging of his wife, he successfully auditioned for the television game show Jeopardy! in 1986 and won almost $50,000. He returned for the program's Ultimate Tournament of Champions.

== Books ==
- Readings in the Philosophy of Language, co-edited with Charles Travis; Prentice-Hall, Inc.; Englewood Cliffs, New Jersey; 1971.
- Linguistic Representation, D. Reidel Publishing Co.; Dordrecht, Holland; 1974.
  - Pallas Paperback edition, 1978; · Second edition, 1981.
- The Practice of Philosophy, Prentice-Hall, Inc.; Englewood Cliffs, New Jersey; 1978
  - Second edition, revised and enlarged, 1984.
  - Third edition, newly revised and enlarged, Prentice-Hall, Inc.; Upper Saddle River, New Jersey; 1996.
- One World and Our Knowledge of It, D. Reidel Publishing Co.; Dordrecht, Holland; 1980.
- Thinking Clearly About Death, Prentice-Hall, Inc.; Englewood Cliffs, New Jersey.; 1983.
  - Second edition, revised and enlarged; Hackett Publishing Co.; Indianapolis, Indiana, and Cambridge, Massachusetts; 1998.
- The Thinking Self, Temple University Press; Philadelphia, Pennsylvania; 1986.
- Beyond Formalism: Naming and Necessity for Human Beings, Temple University Press; Philadelphia, Pennsylvania; 1994
- Three Conversations About Knowing, Hackett Publishing Co.; Indianapolis, Indiana, and Cambridge, Massachusetts; 2000
- Thinking About Knowing, Oxford University Press; Oxford; 2002
- Accessing Kant, Oxford University Press; Oxford: 2005
- Wilfrid Sellars: Fusing the Images, Oxford University Press; Oxford: 2007
- The Impoverished Students' Book of Cookery, Drinkery and House Keepery, A Zine.

== See also ==
- American philosophy
- List of American philosophers
