= Christopher Gauker =

American philosopher

Education
- Education: University of Pittsburgh (PhD)
- Thesis: The Refutation of Internalism: An Essay on Intentionality (1984)
- Doctoral advisor: Wilfrid Sellars

Philosophical work
- Era: 21st-century philosophy
- Region: Western philosophy
- Institutions: University of Salzburg; University of Cincinnati
- Main interests: Philosophy of language
- Website: www.christophergauker.com

Christopher Gauker is an American philosopher and Professor of Philosophy at the University of Salzburg. He is known for his work on philosophy of language.

== Life ==
Gauker grew up in Bloomington, Minnesota and attended the University of Chicago, where Donald Davidson directed his bachelor's thesis. He received his doctoral degree from the University of Pittsburgh, where Wilfrid Sellars directed his dissertation. Before coming to Salzburg, he was a professor at the University of Cincinnati.

== Books ==
- Words and Images: An Essay on the Origin of Ideas, Oxford University Press, 2011
- Conditionals in Context, MIT Press, 2005
- Words without Meaning, MIT Press, 2003
- Thinking Out Loud: An Essay on the Relation between Thought and Language, Princeton University Press, 1994

== See also ==
- Meaning (philosophy of language)
- Meaning (linguistics)
