= Thomas Dewar Weldon =

British philosopher (1896–1958)

Thomas Dewar Weldon MC*
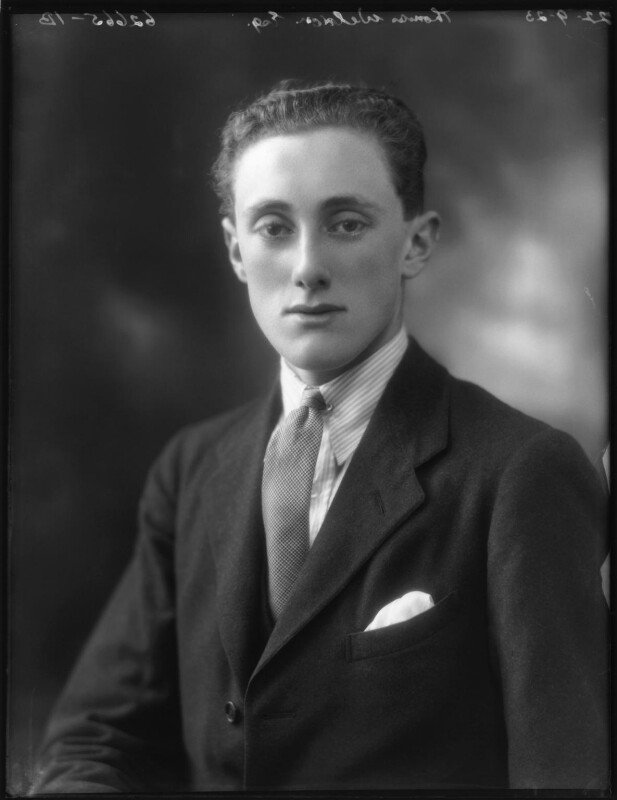
- Weldon in 1923
- Born: 5 December 1896; Marylebone, London, England
- Died: 13 May 1958 (aged 61); Oxford, England

Education
- Education: Magdalen College, Oxford

Philosophical work
- Era: 20th-century philosophy
- Region: Western philosophy
- School: Analytic philosophy Ordinary language philosophy
- Institutions: Magdalen College, Oxford
- Notable students: Wilfrid Sellars
- Main interests: Ethics

Thomas Dewar "Harry" Weldon (5 December 1896 – 13 May 1958) was a British philosopher.

== Life ==
Thomas Weldon was born at 3 Bryanston Mansions, York Street, Marylebone, London, in 1896. After an education at Tonbridge School, he won a scholarship to read Literae humaniores at Magdalen College, Oxford, which he postponed to become an officer in the Royal Field Artillery in 1915. He spent World War I in France and Belgium, rising to acting captain, being wounded and winning the Military Cross and Bar. He finally went up to Oxford in 1919, graduating with a first class degree in 1921. Weldon was elected a fellow and philosophy tutor at his college two years later, getting to know C. S. Lewis. He then served as Rhodes travelling fellow in 1930.

During World War II, he was a temporary civil servant in London from 1939 to 1942, then Personal Staff Officer to "Bomber Harris" in RAF Bomber Command at High Wycombe from 1942 to 1945. His final duties there involved justifying Harris's controversial bombing strategy to politicians and the public.

His death in 1958 was attributed by college rumour to suicide but was in fact due to a cerebral haemorrhage.

== Characterization of teaching style ==
In a review in the London Review of Books of a newly published work by Niall Ferguson, R. W. Johnson said that it amounted to a tutorial: "The idea is to teach the young to think and argue, and the real past masters at it (Harry Weldon was always held up as an example to me) were those who first argued undergraduates out of their received opinions, then turned around after a time and argued them out of their new-found radicalism, leaving them mystified as to what they believed and suspended in a free-floating state of cleverness."

== Works ==
- Introduction to Kant's Critique of Pure Reason (1945; 2nd ed., 1958)
- States and Morals (1946)
- The Vocabulary of Politics (1953)

== Sources ==
- "Weldon, Thomas Dewar". Oxford Dictionary of National Biography (online ed.). Oxford University Press. doi:10.1093/ref:odnb/53261. (Subscription, Wikipedia Library access or UK public library membership required.)
- R. W. Johnson, Look Back in Laughter: Oxford's Postwar Golden Age (2015).
