= Conceptual engineering =

Field of analytic philosophy

Conceptual engineering is a field in Anglophone analytic philosophy that focuses on how to best assess and improve conceptual schemes and repertoires that are of interest to mostly Western analytic philosophers. One of its key features is its normative agenda: conceptual engineers aim to prescribe which concepts we ought to have and use, instead of merely describing those we have and use. The most standard reference in the literature is to Rudolf Carnap's notion of explication as a precursory method of conceptual engineering for theoretical purposes.

Simon Blackburn and Richard Creath are each credited with introducing the term "conceptual engineering." David Chalmers credits Creath with priority for his use of the term in the introduction to his edited volume of correspondence between Carnap and Willard Van Orman Quine, Dear Carnap, Dear Van (1990), while acknowledging that credit is more typically given to Blackburn. Though Carnap is now credited as a conceptual engineer, he only used the term "linguistic engineering."

Conceptual engineering can be understood in terms of three components: design, which is about the normative improvement of concepts; implementation, which is about the actual uptake of the prescribed concepts via advocacy strategies; and evaluation, which is about the quality assessment of concepts along different dimensions (explanatory, epistemic, moral, etc.). Current work in conceptual engineering goes in two main directions. Case study research, on one hand, focuses on specific concepts and then advocates for specific ameliorations. Metaphilosophical research, on the other hand, explicitly theorizes conceptual engineering as a philosophical method and deals with its foundational issues.

Work in conceptual engineering largely ignores philosophical traditions and concepts in the Majority World, it has been pointed out that overlooking differences across cultural context could lead to imposition of hegemonic Western concepts on non-Western communities. Other approaches to conceptual ethics includes conceptual decolonization and conceptual misalignment.

Within the Western analytic tradition, a common objection to conceptual engineering argues that instead of revising and improving existing concepts, conceptual engineering creates new concepts incongruent with the old ones, and is thus philosophically irrelevant or merely changing the subject. One response to this objection is to take a functionalist view of conceptual engineering, such that so long as the new concepts serve the same function as the old concepts, conceptual engineering preserves the relevant subject matter and no problematic discontinuity obtains. Another response, invoked by Herman Cappelen, argues that the relevant continuity to be preserved in conceptual engineering is that of topics; as long as there is continuity in the topics our concepts address, Cappelen argues, there is continuity in our philosophical inquiry even as the intension and extension of concepts change.
