= Psychological nominalism =

Psychological nominalism is the view advanced in Wilfrid Sellars' 1956 paper "Empiricism and Philosophy of Mind" (EPM) that explains psychological concepts in terms of public language use. Sellars describes psychological nominalism as the view that “all awareness of sorts, resemblances, facts, etc., in short, all awareness…is a linguistic affair.”

Judging solely from the mention in EPM, psychological nominalism would seem to be a form of verbal behaviorism, which holds that ascriptions of psychological states are definitionally equivalent to predictions about behavior. For example, the verbal behaviorist holds that a statement like "John is scared of thunderstorms" is meaningful only insofar as it can be parsed into predictions concerning the sorts of things John is likely to say and/or do in the event of a thunderstorm (i.e. "John will say, or have a propensity to say, "I am scared" when he hears thunder" or "John will hide, or have a propensity to hide, his face when he sees lightning").

Psychological nominalism extends the verbal behaviorist's explanation of psychological states (like fear, love, desire, thinking etc.) to cognitive states (being aware, knowing, etc.) while denying the premise that falsifiability criteria can give statements their meaning. The psychological nominalist concedes that survival of mental terminology in natural language can be explained in terms of the practical utility of mental-state ascriptions, but denies that this constitutes an analysis of the meaning of any particular mental-state ascription because the psychological nominalist contends that the meaning of any term, mental or otherwise, is irreducibly bound with its usage. Thus, the verbal behaviorist fails to give a completely philosophically satisfying account of psychological statements because he fails to recognize that the linguistic statements are themselves meaningful in light of the kinds of behavior associated with them.
