= Richard Creath =

American philosopher of science (born 1947)

- Born: December 15, 1947 (age 78)
- Awards: Fellowship, NEH (1987–1988); Fellow, AAAS (2009); President's Professor, ASU (2011)

Education
- Education: Knox College (BA, 1969); University of Pittsburgh (MA, 1972 & 1974; PhD, 1975)
- Thesis: Science, Syntax and Semantics: An Examination of the Philosophy of Language of Rudolf Carnap (1975)
- Doctoral advisor: Wilfrid Sellars

Philosophical work
- Era: 21st-century philosophy
- Region: Western philosophy
- School: Analytic philosophy
- Institutions: Arizona State University
- Main interests: Philosophy of science
- Notable ideas: Conceptual engineering

Richard Creath (born December 15, 1947) is an American philosopher of science particularly known for his work on the logical empiricism and philosophy of language of Rudolf Carnap and Willard Van Orman Quine. He has been credited with introducing "conceptual engineering" to analytic philosophy.

Creath is emeritus President's Professor of philosophy and life sciences at Arizona State University and is a fellow of the American Association for the Advancement of Science. He has been general editor for Rudolf Carnap's collected works and a board member of the Vienna Circle Institute.

== Early life and education ==
Creath was born December 15, 1947. He received a BA in philosophy from Knox College in 1969, where he graduated Phi Beta Kappa. He attained an MA in philosophy from the University of Pittsburgh in 1972 and in history and philosophy of science in 1974, while supported by a graduate fellowship 1969–1974, then received his PhD in philosophy from the University of Pittsburgh in 1975.

He completed his PhD under Wilfrid Sellars on the topic of Rudolf Carnap's philosophy of language, with a thesis titled Science, Syntax and Semantics: An Examination of the Philosophy of Language of Rudolf Carnap.

== Career ==
Creath became a professor of philosophy at Arizona State University (ASU) in 1974 and a professor of life sciences as well in 2003. He has directed ASU's History and Philosophy program since 2003, and he became a President's Professor at ASU in 2011. 2010–2013 he worked as an adjunct scientist at the Marine Biological Laboratory at Woods Hole, Massachusetts.

Within philosophy, he is a specialist in philosophy of science and logical empiricism, particularly the work of Rudolf Carnap and Willard Van Orman Quine and the issue of analytic propositions in their thinking. He was a curator of the Rudolf Carnap Collection at the University of Pittsburgh 1974–1981, a 1987–1988 National Endowment for the Humanities fellow for work on the Carnap–Quine debates, the general editor for Carnap's collected works 2000–, and a board member of the Vienna Circle Institute 2008–. He wrote the article on Carnap for the 1998 Routledge Encyclopedia of Philosophy, was co-editor of The Cambridge Companion to Carnap published in 2007, and wrote the entry "Logical Empiricism" for the Stanford Encyclopedia of Philosophy appearing 2011.

Creath has been credited by David Chalmers with introducing the term "conceptual engineering" to philosophy in his introduction to Dear Carnap, Dear Van (1990), while acknowledging that credit for the term is more typically given to Simon Blackburn. Though Carnap is now credited as a conceptual engineer, he only used the term "linguistic engineering."

Creath was elected a fellow of the American Association for the Advancement of Science in 2009 and chaired its division for the history and philosophy of science 2010–2011.

== Selected works ==
=== Books ===
- Edited: Dear Carnap, Dear Van: The Quine-Carnap Correspondence and Related Work, University of California Press (1990). ISBN 978-0-520-0-6847-6 doi:10.2307/jj.8501222
- Edited: Biology and Epistemology. Co-edited with Jane Maienschein. Cambridge University Press (2000). ISBN 978-0-521-59701-2
- Edited: The Cambridge Companion to Carnap. Co-edited with Michael Friedman. Cambridge University Press (2007). ISBN 978-113-90-0164-9 doi:10.1017/CCOL9780521840156
- Edited: Carnap and the Legacy of Logical Empiricism, Springer (2012). ISBN 978-94-007-3928-4 doi:10.1007/978-94-007-3929-1
- General Editor: The Collected Works of Rudolf Carnap, 14 volumes. Oxford University Press. Most volumes still forthcoming.
  - Vol 1: Early Writings (2019). ISBN 978-0-198-74840-3
  - Vol 7: Studies in Semantics (2024). ISBN 978-0-192-89487-8

=== Articles ===
- “The Root of the Problem,” Linguistics and Philosophy (1977), 1:273–275. doi:10.1007/BF00351108 JSTOR 25000958
- “Nominalism by Theft,” American Philosophical Quarterly (1980), 17:311–318. JSTOR 20013879
- “Taking Theories Seriously,” Synthese (1985), 62: 317–345. doi:10.1007/BF00869409 JSTOR 20116106
- “The Initial Reception of Carnap's Doctrine of Analyticity,” Nous (1987), 21: 477–499. doi:10.2307/2215669 JSTOR 2215669
- “Every Dogma Has Its Day,” Erkenntnis (1991), 35: 347–389. doi:10.1007/BF00388294 JSTOR 20012376
- “Carnap's Conventionalism,” Synthese (1992), 93:141–165. doi:10.1007/BF00869424 JSTOR 20117711
- “Quine and the Limit Assumption in Peirce’s Theory of Truth,” Philosophical Studies (1998), 90:109–112. doi:10.1023/A:1004263318069 JSTOR 4320842
- “The Role of History in Science,” Journal of the History of Biology (2010), 43:207–214. doi:10.1007/s10739-009-9208-x JSTOR 40802740
- “The Logical and the Analytic,” Synthese (2016), 194(1): 79-96. doi:10.1007/s11229-015-0685-5 JSTOR 26166265

=== Chapters ===
- “Carnap's Scientific Realism: Irenic or Ironic?” The Heritage of Logical Positivism, Nicholas Rescher, ed., University Press of America (1985), 117–131.
- “The Unimportance of Semantics” Science and Philosophy in the Twentieth Century, Sahotra Sarkar, ed., Vol. 3, Logic, Probability, and Epistemology: The Power of Semantics, Garland Publishing (1996), 389–400.
- “Are Dinosaurs Extinct?” Machine Discovery. Jan M. Zytkow, ed., Kluwer (1997), 285–297. doi:10.1007/978-94-017-2124-0_6
- with Jane Maienschein, “Introduction,” Biology and Epistemology, Cambridge University Press (2000), ix–xviii.
- “Quine on the Intelligibility and Relevance of Analyticity,” The Cambridge Companion to Quine, Cambridge University Press (2004), 47–64. doi:10.1017/CCOL0521630568.003
- “(Anti-)Metaphysics in the Thirties: And Why Should Anyone Care Now?” Philosophy of Science in Europe: European Philosophy of Science and the Viennese Heritage, Springer (2013), 67–76. doi:10.1007/978-3-319-01899-7_5
