= Concept =

Fundamental unit of cognition

A concept is a fundamental unit of cognition that classifies entities and encodes shared features. Concepts make it possible to form and combine ideas, draw inferences, and refer to external objects. They act as the meanings of words and play a central role in many cognitive processes, including perception, memory, and reasoning. Researchers distinguish different types of concepts based on their internal structure, mode of acquisition, and domain. These include simple and complex concepts, learned and innate concepts, concrete and abstract concepts, and natural and logical concepts.

The classical theory holds that concepts are essentially definitions, each characterized by fixed rules determining to which entities the concept applies. Prototype theory rejects this outlook, arguing that concept membership depends on similarity to a prototype—a cluster of features typically associated with the category. According to exemplar theory, similarity derives from individual memories of concrete instances rather than a single prototypical summary representation. Theory theory maintains that concepts are embedded in domain-specific theories, while conceptual atomism argues that lexical concepts are separate units without internal structure. Philosophers debate whether concepts are mental representations or abstract objects that exist independently of individual minds.

Concept learning is the process of acquiring a previously unknown concept, which is required before an individual can use it. Suggested learning mechanisms include associative learning, in which similarities are gradually noticed as learners encounter instances, and hypothesis testing, which involves formulating testable rules. Nativism and empiricism are competing theories about whether there are inborn concepts not learned from experience. Researchers also examine how concept learning develops from childhood to adulthood, how nonhuman animals form concepts, and how computers can model and acquire concepts.

Concepts are relevant to many fields, including psychology, philosophy, and linguistics. Inquiry into their nature originated in antiquity and became a central topic in the 20th century as researchers discussed various theories of concepts and the cognitive mechanisms underlying them.

== Definition and central features ==
Concepts, like the concept fruit, group entities into categories and separate them from others.

Concepts are fundamental units of cognition through which individuals understand the world. They make it possible to form and combine ideas, classify things, draw inferences, grasp the meanings of words, and refer to external entities. Concepts are often understood as abstract representations or ideas that different people can share. They encode common features of objects and events, grouping individual things into categories. For example, the concepts car, teacher, and prime number encode information about their respective kinds, conveying what members of each group have in common. Concepts are involved in many mental processes, including perception, memory, reasoning, learning, and decision-making. They are relevant to several fields of inquiry, such as philosophy, psychology, linguistics, and cognitive science. Their exact definition is disputed and varies by discipline.

The intension of a concept is its sense or the features it encodes. The extension of a concept is the set of all entities to which it refers. A concept is typically a general entity that applies to many different things. For example, the concept city refers to New York, Paris, Tokyo, and many others. Philosophers also discuss singular concepts, which refer only to a single entity, such as the concept of the planet Mars. There are also empty concepts without real-world instances, like the concept unicorn.

Concepts are components of thought but not fully formed thoughts: they are subpropositional units, like the concept baby, that do not amount to complete propositions, like the statement "the baby is sleeping". Accordingly, concepts apprehend the character of something without asserting or negating anything about it. Concepts are further distinguished from nonconceptual contents—mental representations that do not require concept possession. Raw sense data, such as colors, shapes, and sounds, are often discussed as examples of nonconceptual contents. According to this view, perception contains more information than what is conceptually grasped. For example, a person may visually distinguish differences between similar shades of red despite lacking distinct concepts for each shade.

Concepts are closely related to language and are often characterized as the meanings of words. However, they are not identical to words: different words can express the same concept, (Note: e.g., the words city and metropolis) and a single word can have several meanings. (Note: For example, the word mouse can denote a small rodent or a computer input device.) It is possible to learn a word without knowing its meaning and to possess a concept without knowing a word for it. Conceptual capacities are primarily associated with humans, but in a broader sense, they are also attributed to some nonhuman animals.

Concepts can form hierarchies in which a superordinate concept, like animal, encompasses subordinate concepts, like mammal.

Concepts can form hierarchies in which a superordinate concept encompasses subordinate concepts. For instance, the superordinate concept animal covers the subordinate concept mammal. These hierarchies can span multiple levels, for example, the concept mammal is itself superordinate to the subordinate concept fox. All members of a subordinate concept inherit the defining features of their superordinate concepts.

To use a concept, an individual must possess it. Concept acquisition is the process of learning a concept, as when a child learns the concept cat by seeing, hearing, and interacting with cats. In some cases, new concepts are formed by combining pre-existing ones, such as combining the concepts white and cat to form the concept white cat. Concepts are closely related to conception, which denotes either the act of developing an idea or beliefs about what makes something fall under a concept.

The word concept originates from the Latin term concipere, meaning 'to conceive, to take in'. Through the perfect participle conceptus, the Latin word entered Middle English, with the earliest documented use in 1479.

== Roles ==
Concepts play multiple cognitive roles. They function as categories that group objects or events into classes and make it possible to distinguish between them. For instance, the concept turtle classifies entities into turtles and non-turtles. Categorization is essential to human cognition to simplify the complexity of the world by picking out relevant characteristics and ignoring irrelevant differences, which reduces cognitive load. When an individual encounters a new entity, categorization helps them understand and interact with it. For example, recognizing a plastic stick with bristles as a toothbrush conveys the object's purpose. Correct categorization is vital for survival and everyday functioning, such as distinguishing edible from poisonous plants. It typically happens fast and unconsciously, forming the foundation for more sophisticated cognitive activities.

These activities include inference and logical reasoning, in which people access information they associate with distinct concepts. Once an entity is categorized, individuals can draw conclusions and predict outcomes based on their prior knowledge, even if they have not encountered the specific entity before. A person who possesses the concept shovel can not only distinguish shovels from other objects but also infer related information, such as their use for digging. Similarly, concepts help individuals explain the world around them. If a group is chanting slogans and waving scarves in the street, categorizing them as football fans makes sense of their behavior.

Several of these functions come together in the process of decision-making, in which conceptual thought evaluates different courses of action to select the most beneficial one. For example, a doctor may identify the symptoms of a patient, infer the underlying disease, and then choose the treatment best suited to address the root cause of the illness. This way, conceptual understanding plays a key role in guiding action. Some concepts are directly related to goal-directed planning, such as the concept "things needed for a camping trip".

As meanings of words, concepts play a key role in language. Linguistic conventions are social rules that link words to meanings, allowing individuals to express their ideas. Accordingly, concepts aid communication and social coordination by serving as stable meanings that people can transmit, share, and think about.

Concepts structure perception and guide attention. They further organize memory, helping individuals encode and retrieve information associated with specific ideas. (Note: Ideasthesia is another concept-related phenomenon in which the activiation of concepts triggers phenomenal experiences. For example, the concept of the letter A may evoke a shade of red.) Similarly, concepts play a key role in learning through generalization and abstraction. Individuals may update mental representations as they encounter new instances of a concept or grasp novel relations.

== Types ==
Several types of concepts are discussed in the academic literature, distinguished by internal structure, form of acquisition, domain, and mode of grouping. Complex concepts are created by combining simpler concepts to encode more specific information. In some cases, they are formed by intersecting the meanings of two concepts. For example, combining the concepts red and apple yields the complex concept red apple. In other cases, the combination occurs by using one concept to modify the meaning of another concept. For instance, the concepts boat and house can be combined into the concepts boathouse (a house for boats) and houseboat (a boat for dwelling), depending on the direction of modification. Complex concepts contrast with simple or primitive ones, which are not composed of other concepts. Simple concepts are closely related to lexical concepts, which are the meanings of single words, such as bachelor and bird. Some theorists argue that most or all lexical concepts are simple.

Another contrast is between learned and innate concepts. Learned concepts are acquired through experience, instruction, or reasoning. For example, a person may learn the concept chess by watching others play, studying the rules, or playing themselves. Innate concepts, by contrast, are inborn. They provide basic representations or categories of understanding that enable individuals to interpret the world without prior learning. Academic debates address the relation between learned and innate concepts, including the questions of whether there are innate concepts and whether learning new concepts depends on innate ones.

The relation to experience plays a central role in the contrast between concrete and abstract concepts. Concrete concepts refer to entities that can be directly perceived, such as chairs or apples. This immediate connection to experience is absent in abstract concepts, such as idea and infinity. In practice, the contrast is not a strict dichotomy but a continuum, with many concepts exhibiting varying degrees of concreteness or abstraction. In some cases, the connection to experience is established indirectly through inference and causal processes. For example, the concept electron describes physical entities that humans cannot directly observe. However, their existence and properties can be inferred from experimental measurements. The lack of sensory anchoring generally makes abstract concepts more difficult to learn. Children typically acquire concrete concepts first and take longer to master abstract ones. A related distinction is between a posteriori and a priori concepts. A posteriori concepts can only be learned or justified through sensory experience, which is not required for a priori concepts.

Logical concepts are based on precise rules. They have clear definitions determining their essential features. For instance, the geometrical concept square is a logical concept, defined as a figure with four sides of equal length and right angles between them. Logical concepts have precise boundaries: they clearly establish to which entities they apply and to which ones they do not. Natural concepts, by contrast, do not have exact definitions and do not unambiguously determine their range of application. Many everyday concepts, such as emotion, are natural concepts whose boundaries are fuzzy and difficult to delineate. Accordingly, natural concepts admit borderline cases and vary by degrees, meaning that some entities are more typical members than others. Theories of concepts discuss whether all concepts are, at a fundamental level, characterized by precise definitions or by more vague similarities to a prototype or a set of exemplars.

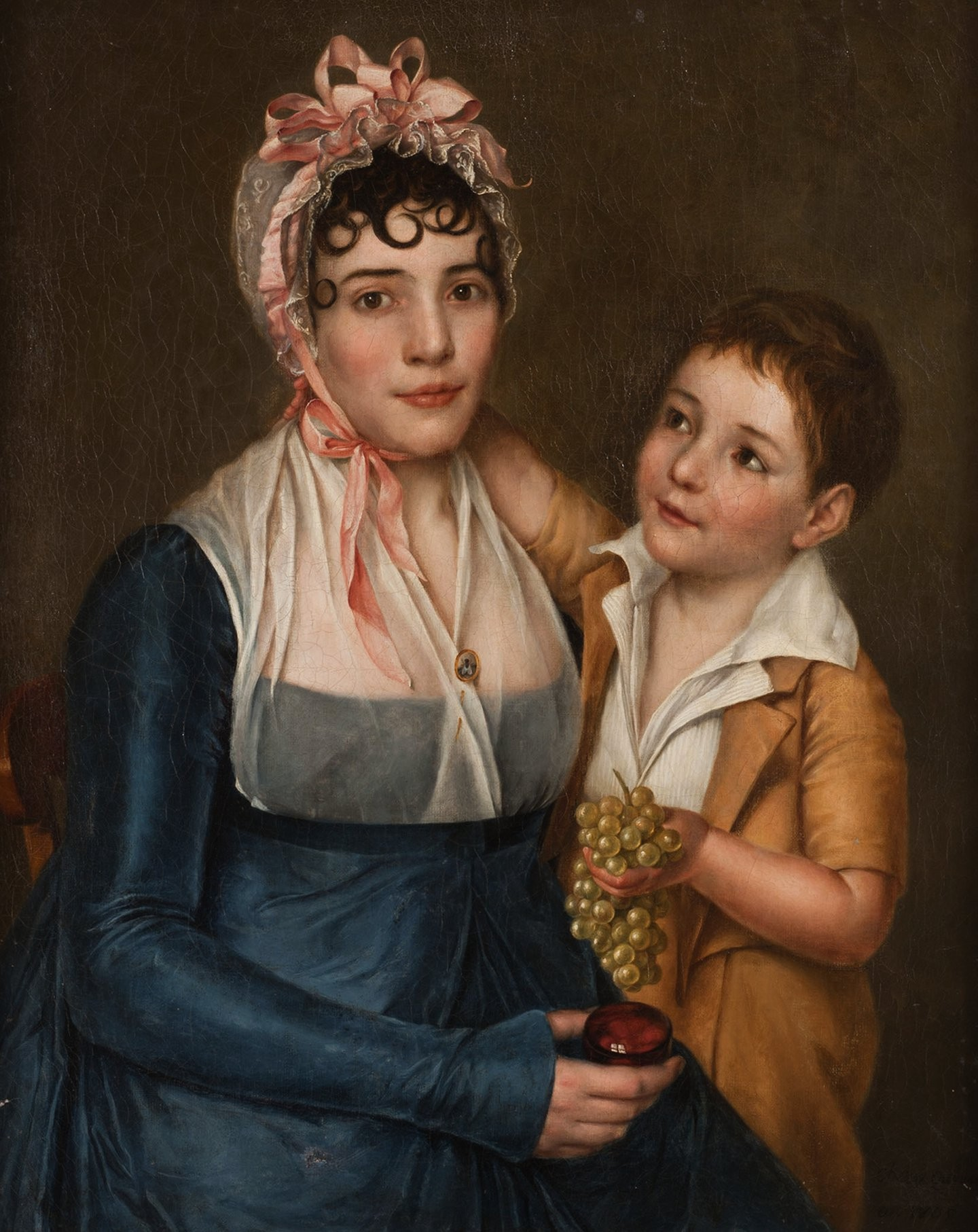
The concept mother is a relational concept that depends on external connections to other entities, whereas the concept triangle is intrinsically defined based on inherent features.

Other distinctions focus on how concepts group entities into classes. Relational concepts describe entities by their interactions with or connections to other things, such as the concepts obstacle and grandmother. They include goal-derived concepts, which organize items according to an external function or a shared purpose. For example, the category diet foods includes a variety of otherwise dissimilar items that serve the purpose of supporting weight loss. Relational concepts contrast with intrinsically defined concepts, which group entities based on inherent properties independent of extrinsic purposes or external roles, such as the concept triangle. Other proposed types include affective categories, which group entities by the emotions they evoke, and ad hoc categories, which are formed spontaneously, typically in response to situational demands, such as the concept things to grab in a fire.

General concepts apply to many entities, while singular concepts refer to one specific entity, and empty concepts have no instances. Superordinate and subordinate concepts are distinguished by their level of specificity, as in the contrast between the concepts animal and mouse.

Concepts can also be classified by domain. Everyday concepts are non-technical categories used in daily life. They are usually practical, intuitive groupings relevant to ordinary interaction with the world but without precise definitions or exact boundaries. Scientific concepts, by contrast, are more precise and may lack immediate relevance to everyday experience. They are often based on exact definitions, typically with the goal of eliminating ambiguity and ensuring consistent measurement, prediction, and explanation. More fine-grained classifications distinguish between the specific fields to which concepts belong, including mathematical, linguistic, psychological, and moral concepts.

Descriptive concepts provide neutral characterizations of entities. Evaluative or normative concepts, by contrast, concern values and norms, expressing what should be rather than what is. They are further divided into thin and thick concepts. Thin concepts encode pure evaluations without additional descriptive contents, such as right and wrong or good and bad. Thick concepts combine evaluative and descriptive features, indicating both what something is and how it should be assessed. For example, courageous and cruel are thick concepts since they express character traits in addition to evaluations.

== Theories ==
Various theories about the nature of concepts are discussed in the academic literature. Theories of the structure of concepts ask how conceptual contents are encoded, for example, whether each concept is defined through exact rules or by grades of similarity. Ontological theories examine whether concepts are mental constructs or exist independently of individual minds.

=== Structure ===
==== Classical ====
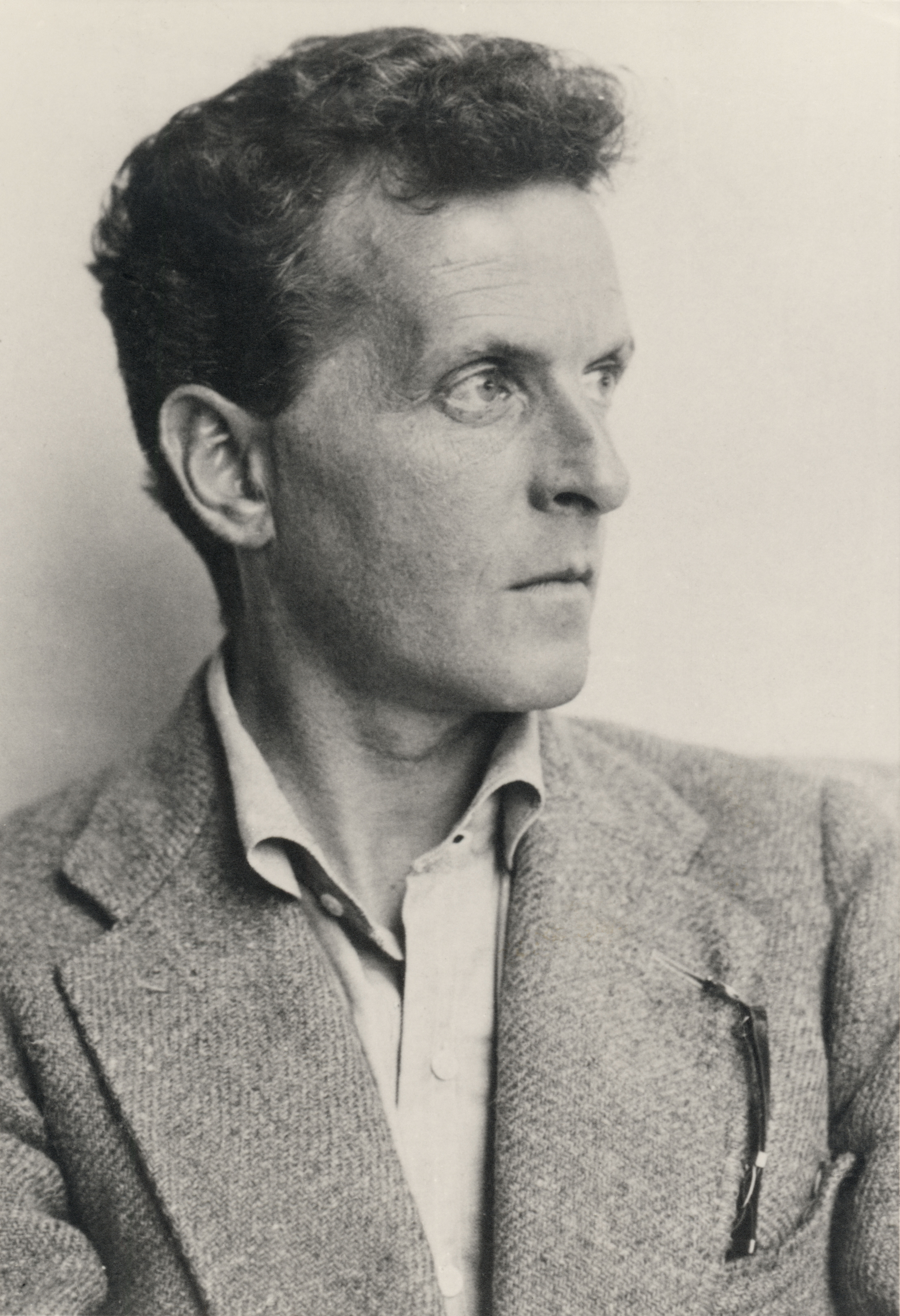
Ludwig Wittgenstein challenged the classical theory, arguing that concepts are usually based on family resemblance without precise underlying definitions.

The classical theory (also called definitionism) asserts that concepts are essentially definitions. It proposes that there is a set of fixed rules for each concept, determining to which entities the concept applies. For example, the defining rules of the concept bachelor are typically given as "unmarried adult human male". These rules are regarded as necessary and sufficient conditions: all entities meeting the criteria are instances, and anything that fails to meet them is excluded.

According to the classical theory, concepts have precise boundaries: any entity either clearly falls under a concept or does not, with no intermediate cases. It also holds that all members of a concept are equal: there are no central or peripheral examples, just as there are no degrees of membership.

Despite its prominence in the history of philosophy, the empirical correctness of the classical theory has been challenged on various grounds. Critics assert that many everyday concepts are vague and lack exact boundaries. They also note that people usually regard some members as better examples than others, an effect measurable through the speed and accuracy of judgments about membership. A related argument states that many concepts lack generally accepted definitions based on fixed rules. For example, there is no widely accepted set of features of the concept game that applies equally to all games and distinguishes them from all other entities. (Note: The neo-classical theory is an attempt to overcome some of these difficulties by weakening the requirements of the classical theory. For example, it holds that concepts encode partial definitions, such as necessary conditions that are not by themselves sufficient.)

==== Prototypes and exemplars ====
Prototype theory asserts that concepts are summary representations that incorporate the most typical attributes of the category.

Exemplar theory holds that the mind stores individual memories of exemplars as reference points for assessing concept membership.

Prototype theory emerged as a response to the difficulties faced by the classical theory. It rejects the existence of precise definitions, arguing instead for gradual concept membership based on degrees of similarity. Prototype theorists assert that each concept is characterized by a cluster of features, called a prototype, that includes the most typical attributes of members and serves as an abstract summary representation. For example, the prototype bird includes features such as having feathers, having a beak, having wings, and being able to fly. On this view, categorization happens by matching features: individuals compare the features they perceive to stored prototypes to decide whether an entity belongs to a category. Cognition assesses whether family resemblance to the entity is sufficiently high, even if the entity does not possess all prototypical features. Some prototypes may even include incompatible features that no single instance can satisfy, like the features long-haired and short-haired for the concept dog. Different features have different weights, meaning that matching the most central features is more important than matching peripheral ones. For instance, the feature can harm is more central to the concept weapon than the feature made of iron.

Critics of the prototype theory assert that it succeeds only for some concepts but fails for others. For instance, the concept grandmother is determined by family relations that are not directly perceivable, and prototypical features such as having gray hair and wrinkled skin are not reliable indicators of membership. The prototype theory also struggles to explain how concepts combine to form new ones, a process which often depends on logical relations rather than the aggregation of prototypical attributes. Additionally, some concepts are too specific to have clear prototypical attributes, such as the concept "grandmother whose grandchildren are married to dentists".

Exemplar theory is another similarity-based approach. It rejects the idea that each concept is based on a single abstract summary representation in the form of a prototypical cluster of features. Instead, it holds that the mind stores many exemplars, each a concrete individual instance of the concept. For example, the concept apple is based on individual memories of apples that a person has encountered. Categorizing something as an apple involves comparing it to a set of stored apple exemplars to assess whether it is sufficiently similar to belong to the category. In the widest sense, any apple a person has encountered can serve as an exemplar for future judgments. However, different memories are assigned different weights, with more salient and easily recalled instances exerting greater influence.

==== Theory theory, atomism, and pluralism ====
The theory theory, also called the knowledge approach, holds that concepts are essentially connected to theories. A key idea underlying this outlook is that acquiring a concept is about learning theoretical knowledge relevant to a specific domain and that applying concepts involves theoretical reasoning and the prediction of outcomes. For example, learning the concept electron includes the acquisition of various beliefs about electrons, such as that electrons are elementary particles with a negative charge. The relevant theories need not be scientific—they include informal intuitive understanding, such as a child's commonsense belief that solid objects cannot pass through each other.

One version of the theory theory holds that each concept is a small theory. It asserts that concepts apply to a particular domain, grouping features within this domain and explaining how they interact. A different outlook distinguishes between concepts and theories: it holds that concepts are essentially constituents of theories, functioning as representational units rather than miniature theories. In either view, a central aspect of the theory theory is its holistic outlook: concepts do not exist in isolation but are embedded within a web of interdependent beliefs. For instance, the concept electron depends on the concept negative charge.

One advantage of the theory theory over prototype theory is its ability to explain categorizations based on logical relations where perceptual similarity is overridden by theoretical knowledge. It also aligns with empirical research about how children learn concepts and gradually refine their understanding. Critics maintain that the holistic outlook implies that people rarely share concepts: each person has different background beliefs, meaning that their concepts do not fully coincide.

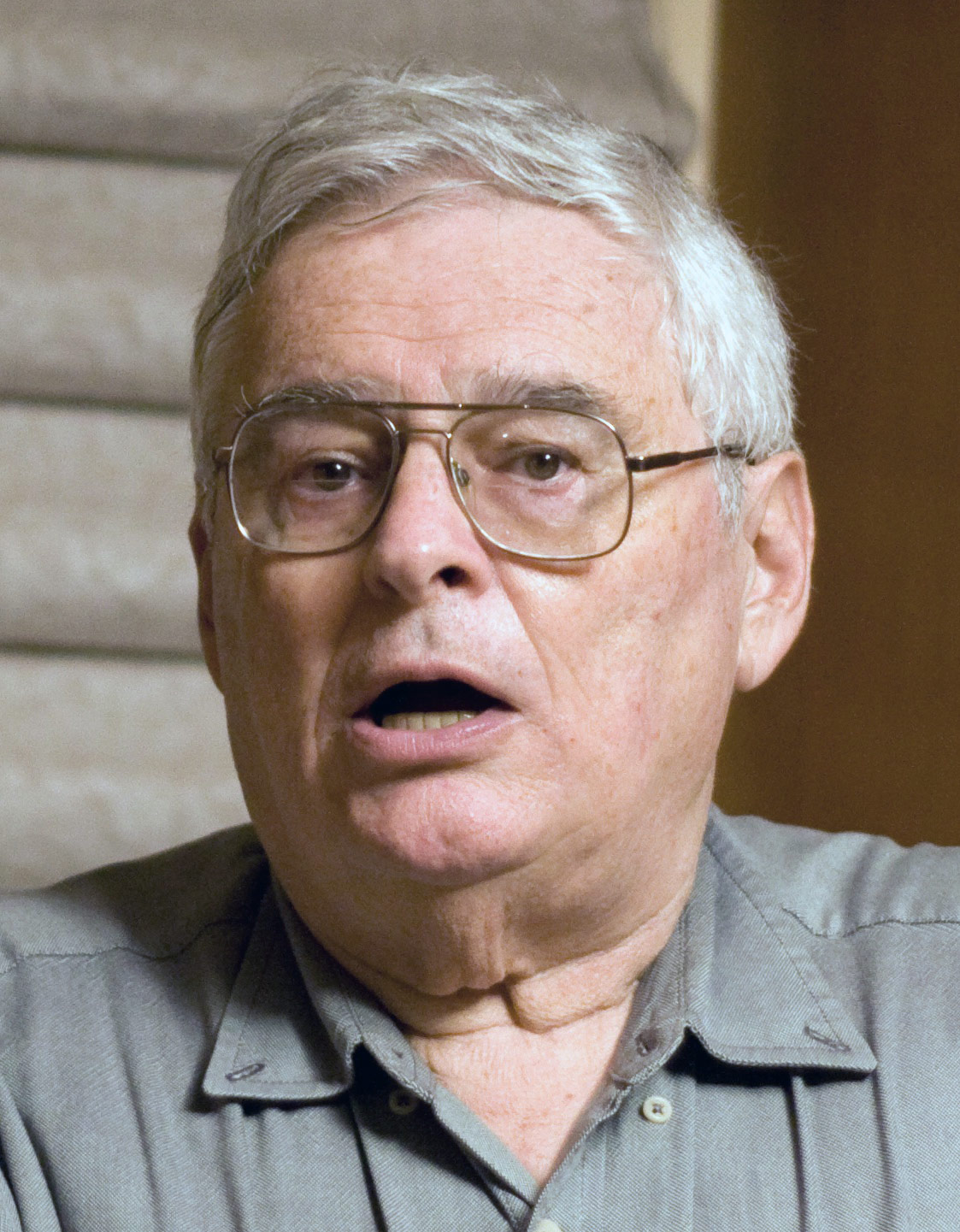
Jerry Fodor proposed conceptual atomism, arguing that lexical concepts are simple units without internal structure.

In contrast to the theory theory, conceptual or informational atomism rejects the holistic outlook. It asserts that lexical concepts are simple units that do not depend on each other. Accordingly, the concept cow does not depend on theories about cows or on cow-related concepts. It is simply defined through its referents: the cows to which it refers. In this sense, lexical concepts lack internal structure. This view maintains that knowledge about the relations among lexical concepts is built on concepts but is not an essential part of them. Conceptual atomism holds that besides lexical concepts, there are also complex concepts, which have an internal structure constructed from simpler concepts.

Pluralist or hybrid approaches seek to resolve disagreements between other theories by combining them. According to one proposal, each concept has multiple structures that serve different roles. For instance, the prototype structure supports fast and similarity-based categorization, while the theory-like structure supports slow and reflective reasoning. A different view suggests that the different structures belong to distinct concepts. Accordingly, people form several competing concepts for each category. For example, a person may have multiple cat concepts, such as a prototype-based cat concept alongside a theory-based cat concept.

=== Ontology ===
==== As mental entities ====
Mind-based theories assert that concepts are psychological constructs dependent on the cognitive capacities of individual thinkers. An influential proposal in cognitive science and philosophy of mind holds that concepts are mental representations. According to this representational theory, the mind operates by transforming and manipulating internal representations, which in turn guide behavior. This approach treats concepts as basic representational units that constitute the building blocks for more complex states. (Note: This view is sometimes combined with the language of thought hypothesis, which argues that concepts and the rules for combining them are analogous to linguistic symbols and grammatical rules.) For example, beliefs are complex representations built from simpler components, like combining the concepts sky and blue to form the belief that the sky is blue. Whether a complex representation is a belief, a desire, or another state depends on the function it plays in the cognitive system, such as its role in motivating action.

A key motivation for this approach is that it clarifies the intimate relation between concepts and cognition by treating concepts as constituents of cognition. Another argument maintains that a representation-based view is essential for explaining the productivity of thought—the ability to form an unlimited variety of thoughts by combining a limited number of basic ideas. One criticism of representationalism holds that many mental states do not require an active combination of internal representations. For example, many people believe facts like "zebras in the wild do not wear overcoats" without ever constructing this specific representation. Another objection asserts that representational theories rely too heavily on commonsense views of mental life as a sequence of inner representations while failing to account for embodied aspects of cognition grounded in sensorimotor engagement with the world.

In response to some of these criticisms, another mind-based theory characterizes concepts as abilities. According to this view, the concept cat is not an internal representation but an ability to distinguish cats from other entities and to reason about cats.

==== As abstract objects ====
A different approach, termed Platonism or the semantic view, characterizes concepts as abstract objects. It asserts that concepts do not depend on the individual minds that grasp them or on the things they classify. Instead, it holds that concepts exist outside spacetime and have neither causes nor effects. Accordingly, a concept can exist even if no one has ever thought of it. This view commonly identifies concepts with the meanings of words, maintaining that they mediate between thought and language. It distinguishes between the sense of a concept (the idea it expresses) and its reference (the entities it refers to). This outlook maintains that abstract objects ground the sense even if there is no reference, as is the case with empty concepts like Pegasus.

One argument for Platonism asserts that this view is essential for explaining how different people can share the same ideas despite having distinct minds: concepts act as publicly available meanings that different thinkers can independently access. One difficulty is to explain how this access works: if concepts are non-spatiotemporal abstracta, it is unclear how minds can relate to them, understand them, and reason with them.

=== Others ===
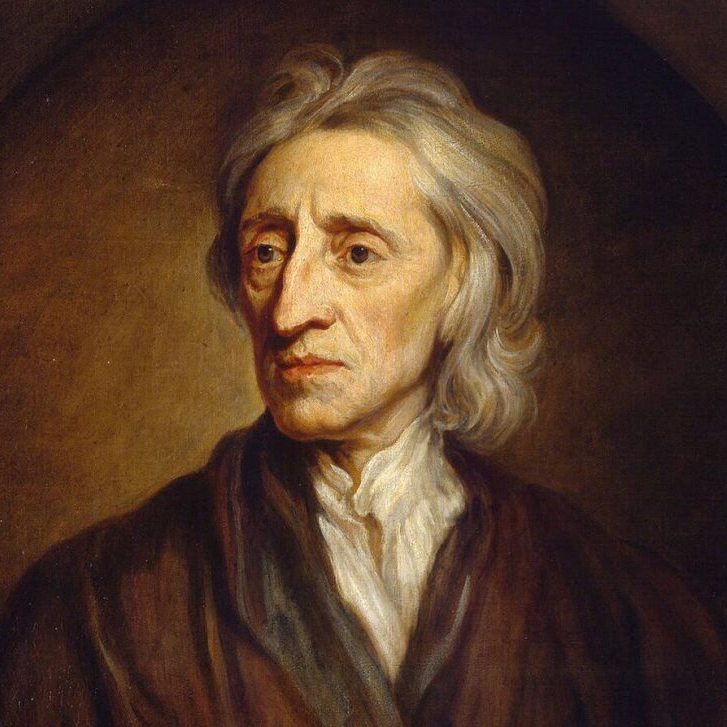
John Locke held that the infant mind is a blank slate that depends on sensory experience to acquire concepts.

Eliminativism about concepts is the view that, strictly speaking, there are no concepts. This view accepts the existence of cognitive processes involved in categorization, inference, and mental representation. However, it rejects the idea of concepts as a unified mechanism that underpins all these activities. Instead, it posits a variety of overlapping capacities that explain the different functions. For example, an eliminativist may accept prototype-based, exemplar-based, and theory-based mechanisms, while denying that they have enough in common to constitute a unified psychological kind called concept.

Empiricism and nativism (also called rationalism) are competing theories about the origin of concepts. According to empiricism, all concepts are learned from experience. This view follows John Locke's metaphor of the infant mind as a blank slate, meaning that all conceptual knowledge is acquired through experience as the mind generalizes incoming sensory data to form abstract ideas. Nativism acknowledges that some concepts are learned from experience but argues that this is not true for all concepts. One form of nativism proposes that certain fundamental concepts presupposed by many cognitive processes are innate and need not be learned, such as the concepts object, agent, number, and space. (Note: The debate between empiricism and nativism is not limited to concepts and also engages other domains, such as discussions about inborn knowledge and linguistic capacities.)

Theories of concept individuation discuss the conditions under which two concepts are identical. Reference-based theories focus on extensions, asserting that concepts are identical if they refer to the same entities. Internalist theories, by contrast, hold that two concepts can differ regarding their internal functions even if they refer to the same entities. For example, inference-based accounts, such as inferential role semantics, compare the roles that concepts play in patterns of inferences. Two-factor theories combine both approaches, arguing that concepts have both external and internal components.

=== History ===
Research into the nature of concepts originated in antiquity. In ancient Greek philosophy, Plato (428–348 BCE) argued for the existence of abstract forms outside the sensory realm that unify many concrete instances under a single concept. His student Aristotle (384–322 BCE) maintained that forms exist within concrete entities rather than separately. He also explored how concepts form categorical hierarchies that organize particulars into genera and species based on shared features.

The distinction between conceptual and nonconceptual experience played a central role in Buddhist thought. For example, Abhidharma philosophy regards nonconceptual experience as the apprehension of pure sensory qualities, while conceptual experience involves recognizing objects through mental labels. In Hindu philosophy, the Nyaya school explored the role of concepts in perception for recognizing and identifying things, distinguishing between nonverbal awareness of raw sensation and concept-based cognition. A central topic in early Chinese epistemology was the relation between names or concepts and real entities, including the question of how to establish a stable alignment between the two.

In medieval Western thought, philosophers debated the problem of universals, asking whether universal entities exist independently of particular things, as concepts in individual minds, or merely as names without reality outside language. Influenced by Aristotle, Thomas Aquinas (1225–1274 CE) held that the senses perceive concrete particulars, while the intellect forms universal concepts used for judgments and reasoning. In the Arabic-Persian tradition, Avicenna (980–1037 CE) held that essences (i.e., what something is) can exist in the external world as qualities of particular things, in the mind as concepts grasping those qualities, and in themselves apart from external things and minds.

Early modern philosophers discussed concepts as ideas that function as general mental representations. Rationalists, like René Descartes (1596–1650) and Gottfried Wilhelm Leibniz (1646–1716), argued that some ideas are innate and do not depend on sensory experience. Empiricists, such as John Locke (1632–1704) and David Hume (1711–1776), rejected this idea, asserting that the mind begins as a blank slate and acquires all ideas about the world from experience. Immanuel Kant (1724–1804) understood concepts as rules for organizing experience. According to him, only the fundamental concepts of understanding, called categories, are inborn. Georg Wilhelm Friedrich Hegel (1770–1831) rejected the view that concepts are merely mental constructs, arguing instead that they are fundamental structures of thought and reality, transcending the divide between subjectivity and objectivity.

Wilhelm Wundt (1832–1920), the father of experimental psychology, used introspection to study the basic components of concepts and the rules for how they can be combined. Behaviorists, such as Clark L. Hull (1884–1952), rejected the introspective method, focusing instead on how concepts shape observable behavior. In developmental psychology, Jean Piaget (1896–1980) analyzed how children acquire concepts in a series of stages moving from concrete to abstract reasoning. Jerome S. Bruner (1915–2016), Jacqueline J. Goodnow (1924–2014), and George A. Austin applied experimental methods to the problem of concept attainment, analyzing the cognitive mechanisms through which individuals learn novel categories. Susan Carey (born 1942) proposed Quinean bootstrapping as one such mechanism to explain how individuals rely on preexisting conceptual resources to acquire genuinely new concepts.

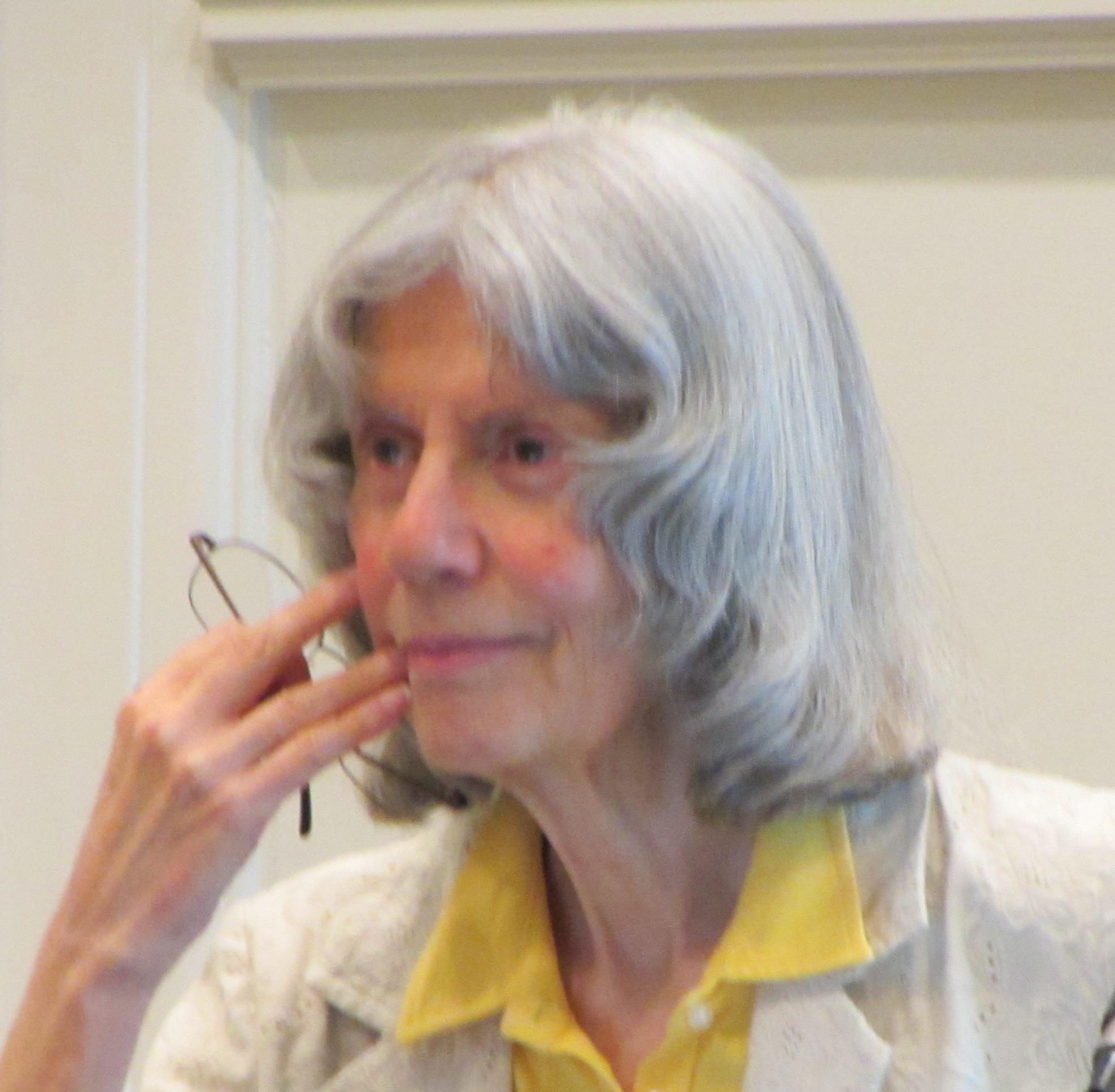
Eleanor Rosch suggested prototype theory as an alternative to the classical theory.

Gottlob Frege (1848–1925) analyzed the meaning content of concepts in terms of sense and reference, distinguishing the ideas they express from the entities they refer to. While the roots of conceptual analysis trace back to Socrates (470–399 BCE), it came to central prominence in 20th-century analytic philosophy as the method of identifying the necessary and sufficient components of concepts, popularized by philosophers such as G. E. Moore (1873–1958). Rudolf Carnap (1891–1970) criticized the imprecision of concepts inherited from natural language. He proposed conceptual engineering to create improved concepts as superior tools for scientific and philosophical inquiry.

In his later philosophy, Ludwig Wittgenstein (1889–1951) analyzed concepts in terms of family resemblance without precise definitions, challenging the classical theory of concepts. His work influenced Eleanor Rosch (born 1938), who proposed prototype theory as a replacement of the classical theory. In response, Douglas Medin (born 1944) and Marguerite M. Schaffer developed exemplar theory, which emphasizes the role of concrete individual memories in contrast to prototypical summary representations. Thomas Kuhn's (1922–1996) account of scientific paradigm shifts inspired theory theory, according to which concepts are embedded in domain-specific theories that guide categorization and prediction. Noam Chomsky (born 1928) argued that humans possess innate capacities that shape the conceptual organization of linguistic knowledge. Jerry Fodor (1935–2017) proposed conceptual atomism, according to which lexical concepts are simple units without internal structure. Other developments in the 20th and 21st centuries include the use of neuroscientific methods to study concepts and approaches in computer science and machine learning to model category learning and representation.

== Formation and learning ==
Concept formation is the acquisition of a new concept. It enables individuals to organize their experience and use the concept in cognitive processes. Concept formation happens as people recognize similarities and regularities in the world, identify common features, and group instances into mental classes.

One key aspect is learning to categorize entities and predict the class membership of new instances. For example, learning the concept fresh vegetable involves recognizing fresh vegetables when encountering them and being able to distinguish them from stale ones. Another aspect concerns information about the concept and its relations to other concepts, such as knowing that fresh vegetables grow from plants and are perishable. Accordingly, learners need to understand what it means for an entity to belong to a category and how to reason with this information to draw inferences. From a behaviorist perspective, concept learning is about generalizing stimuli and acquiring relevant stimulus–response patterns. For instance, learning the concept red involves, among other things, a tendency to respond differently to red objects than to green ones.

Some theorists distinguish concept formation from concept attainment as two stages in the process of mastering concepts. According to this view, concept formation is about dividing entities into classes. Concept attainment is about identifying features through which one can reliably decide whether an entity belongs to a class. For example, grasping the basic idea of the concept edible mushroom belongs to concept formation, whereas learning to discriminate between edible and inedible mushrooms based on color, shape, and size belongs to concept attainment. A different terminology uses the expression discrimination learning for the ability to distinguish concrete features, like size and shape, and reserves the expression concept formation for abstract rules that are not directly observable.

=== Learning mechanisms and situations ===
Several learning mechanisms underlie concept acquisition. Associative learning is based on typical features of a certain type of entity. As learners are repeatedly exposed to instances, they notice similarities and gradually strengthen connections between cues and categories. This process typically yields graded categorization, in which learners associate some entities more closely with a concept than others, like a sparrow as a more typical member of the concept bird than a penguin. Concepts formed this way tend to lack an exact line demarcating where the concept begins or ends. Hypothesis testing is another mechanism in which learners propose precise rules for class membership. They test and revise these rules as they encounter new instances, improving their mastery of a concept. The learning mechanism employed may depend on the type of concept: hypothesis testing is linked to logical concepts with exact boundaries, whereas associative learning is connected to natural concepts with fuzzy boundaries. Quinean bootstrapping, a different proposed mechanism, seeks to explain the acquisition of genuinely new concepts, such as concepts about which learners initially cannot state a hypothesis because they lack the required representational resources. This view asserts that individuals create mental placeholders and approximate these placeholders with familiar concepts until a genuinely new concept is grasped. (Note: Another approach relies on Bayesianism and models concept learning in terms of probabilistic beliefs where accurate beliefs about concept membership are reinforced while wrong ones are weakened.)

Concept formation is also influenced by the learning situation in which it happens. In supervised learning, the learner receives immediate feedback on concept use. This is the case when a child labels animals during a zoo visit and a parent confirms or corrects each label. Feedback is absent in unsupervised learning, such as forming concepts of different music genres without explicit labels or guidance. Semisupervised learning is an intermediate form with occasional feedback. Supervision with labeled examples is central when learning to distinguish between similar categories that are easily conflated without corrective feedback. Another distinction is between self-directed and other-directed learning based on whether the learner chooses which concepts to explore. Increased engagement in self-directed learning typically makes it more effective. Other classifications of learning situations include observational learning, inference learning, and indirect learning. Observational learning involves exposure to pre-paired instances and labels without active guessing. Inference learning focuses on additional knowledge besides the ability to categorize. In indirect learning, concepts are acquired while performing other tasks that require categorization to achieve their goals.

Another research topic examines biases in concept formation, targeting typical errors that learners are prone to make. The confirmation bias happens when learners focus on positive instances to support their hypotheses about a concept while ignoring negative instances that would contradict them. Other biases include the learning tendencies to focus on a small set of related features and to seek consistent contrasts between subtypes within the same category. Learning success also depends on the type of concept that is being learned. For example, concrete concepts tied to sensory experience are easier to learn than abstract concepts lacking tangible referents. For complex concepts formed of several parts, conjunctive categories that require several features together (e.g., large and green) are easier to learn than disjunctive categories that require any one of multiple features (e.g., large or green).

=== Children, animals, and artificial intelligence ===
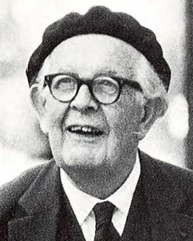
Jean Piaget analyzed how children acquire concepts in a series of stages moving from concrete to abstract reasoning.

Concept formation starts early in life as infants form categories, generalize repeated patterns, and group similar objects together. The mechanisms of conceptual learning in childhood are overall similar to those in adults, but children typically focus more on concrete concepts, guided by a prototype-based understanding. Mastering a new concept often takes longer for children, in part because they have less prior knowledge and have encountered fewer instances in their limited experience. Limitations in working memory are another factor, making it more difficult to grasp atypical cases. For example, this makes it difficult for children to understand that dolphins are not fish. An influential approach to cognitive development was proposed by Jean Piaget, who divided the development from birth to adulthood into four stages, characterized by an increasing capacity for abstract conceptual thought.

Researchers also examine concept formation in animals. This typically happens by presenting animals with discrimination tasks in which they must apply generalized rules to receive rewards. For example, dogs can be trained to respond to commands like sit and come. More complex abilities have been shown in chimpanzees, which can learn and communicate using simple sign languages. There are academic disagreements about the extent to which learned classification behavior in animals amounts to concept formation rather than more basic conditioning through stimulus–response pairings.

The problem of concept formation is also encountered in machine learning, a field of artificial intelligence. In this context, concept formation is about constructing a model that can categorize an entity based on information provided about it. Learning algorithms automatically build models by processing data in the form of a training set and extract rules that underlie the classification. After identifying and generalizing patterns in the training set, systems are able to classify novel instances not encountered before—an ability that can guide automatic decision-making.

== In various fields ==
Because of their central role in human cognition, concepts are relevant to many fields, including psychology, philosophy, and linguistics.

=== Psychology ===
Psychology typically conceives concepts as mental representations that individuals use to categorize entities, organize experience, and guide reasoning. It is interested in how concepts shape diverse cognitive processes and behavior. Concepts influence how perception interprets sensory stimuli and draws attention toward category-relevant features. They help memory encode, store, and retrieve information efficiently by linking it to specific ideas or categories. As the basic units of thought, concepts structure how the mind forms and combines ideas and processes this information through reasoning. They guide decision-making by framing distinct courses of action and shaping expectations about likely consequences.

Psychologists are also interested in the structure of concepts and the cognitive mechanisms that underlie conceptual activity. They distinguish between rule-based approaches, which treat concepts as definitions composed of necessary and sufficient rules, and prototype- or exemplar-based approaches, which analyze concepts in terms of typical features or remembered examples. A related set of questions asks whether concepts are grasped independently of each other or form interlinked patterns.

Another topic in psychology concerns how people acquire new concepts and which learning mechanisms govern this process. This includes the study of the influence of cognitive biases and disorders of conceptual activity. Developmental psychologists examine how the ability to learn and use concepts evolves from childhood to adulthood. Personality psychologists are interested in the self-concept, which includes self-description and self-evaluation, explaining a person's sense of identity over time and consistency of behavior.

Psychologists use several empirical methods to gather data and support their theories. Experimental methods observe individuals in controlled situations. They vary specific factors within these situations to explore how these changes affect individuals. Correlational methods use observation and survey data to detect links among traits or behaviors without establishing cause-effect relations. Early approaches relied on introspection to examine the contents of thought from a first-person perspective, but the results were unreliable. This method was gradually replaced with third-person approaches with more emphasis on the observation of behavior.

=== Philosophy ===
Philosophers are interested in the nature of concepts, discussing their definition and essential features. Some propose that concepts are psychological entities—mental representations or abilities residing in individual minds. Others regard concepts as abstract objects whose existence is independent of human cognition. Because of their nature as general entities that act as categories, concepts raise the problem of universals: whether or in what sense there are universal entities in addition to the particular entities they classify.

Rudolf Carnap proposed conceptual engineering as a philosophical method to create precise concepts.

Concepts also play a key role in the method of conceptual analysis. (Note: Conceptual analysis is commonly regarded as one of several approaches to philosophy, but some schools see it as the only such method.) This method addresses philosophical problems by examining the meanings of concepts, such as knowledge, justice, and beauty. It seeks to identify their components or the necessary and sufficient conditions that govern their proper use. For example, one influential analysis of the concept knowledge identifies three essential components, characterizing it as justified true belief. To confirm or refute such an analysis, philosophers use intuitions, thought experiments, and counterexamples to test whether the suggested conditions capture the meaning of the concept and apply to all of its instances.

Conceptual engineering, another concept-based methodology, extends beyond the analysis of existing concepts, seeking instead to refine or improve them. Its core motivation is that concepts should be designed to fulfill key philosophical functions rather than adhere rigidly to preexisting linguistic norms. Conceptual engineering can also result in the creation of entirely new concepts to capture novel ideas.

Another philosophical topic addresses how conceptual schemes shape a person's perspective on the world. A conceptual scheme is a set of interrelated concepts that organizes experience and meaning-making. It raises the question of whether different individuals or cultures have fundamentally different experiences of reality and whether there is an objective reality, an idea opposed by some forms of relativism. A related issue in the philosophy of science concerns theory-ladenness: the idea that scientific observation and interpretation of empirical data are influenced by the theoretical frameworks on which scientists rely.

=== Linguistics ===
Concepts play a central role in linguistics as the meanings of expressions. Lexical semantics is a subfield that focuses on the meanings of individual words. It explores lexical relations between words, for example, whether two words are synonyms by referring to the same concept or antonyms by referring to opposed concepts. Lexical semantics is further subdivided into semasiology and onomasiology, which differ in their direction of inquiry: semasiology starts from a word and examines its meanings, while onomasiology starts from a meaning and investigates how it is expressed in a particular language. Going beyond the meanings of individual words, compositional semantics studies how several words combine to express complex meanings.

Cognitive semantics, another branch, examines how language and meaning are grounded in human cognition. It is closely related to conceptual semantics, which studies the cognitive structure of concepts and how they connect thought, perception, and action. The interrelation between thought and language is also the topic of the Whorfian hypothesis, which proposes that language shapes thought patterns and that speakers of different languages think differently. A related issue in the philosophy of language asks whether concepts or language are more basic and whether one can exist without the other.

Semantic similarity, another topic in linguistics, is a way of measuring the similarity between semantic contents. For example, the concepts tea and coffee have high semantic similarity because they share many features. Conceptual distance, a related metric, measures the distance between sets of concepts, indicating how difficult it is to understand a topic across disciplines.

=== Other fields ===
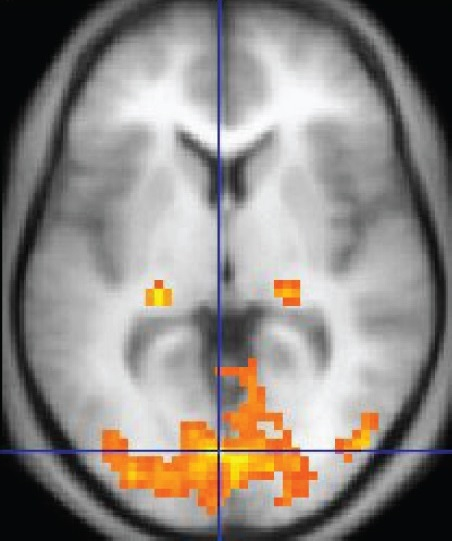
fMRI is a neuroimaging technique that can measure regional brain activity associated with conceptual processes.

Neuroscientists examine how concepts are stored and used in the brain. Among other things, they explore which brain regions encode concepts and how damage to specific areas influences conceptual activities. A key research method is the use of neuroimaging techniques, such as functional magnetic resonance imaging (fMRI), to study region-specific brain activity, often combined with behavioral analyses to link neural activation patterns with task performance. (Note: For example, connectionism interprets concepts as patterns of activation in neural networks.)

Researchers in computer science and artificial intelligence are interested in concepts as formal structures involved in knowledge representation and automated reasoning. They treat concepts as models used to categorize entities and encode information about them. To describe systems with many entities, they employ formal ontologies, such as the Suggested Upper Merged Ontology, which are comprehensive conceptual hierarchies that formalize relationships between concepts. The field of machine learning investigates algorithms that can generalize data from training sets to create and employ novel models of concepts. Cognitive science integrates ideas from psychology, philosophy, linguistics, neuroscience, and computer science to develop unified models of cognition and the role of concepts within it.

Conceptual history is a form of intellectual history that examines the development of concepts and ideas. It typically focuses on fields like science, politics, law, and economics, tracing how their fundamental concepts have evolved over time. It draws on linguistics and social history to study how conceptual developments reflect and shape historical processes.

Concept learning is a pervasive part of education as students grasp new categories, learn to label them, and assess category membership. For example, they learn the concepts fraction in mathematics and photosynthesis in biology. For effective learning, it is usually not sufficient to present students with precise definitions. Instead, educators familiarize students with varied examples, point out contrasts to highlight key features, and engage students in practices to consolidate their understanding. Concept maps, another educational tool, are visual diagrams that use nodes to represent concepts and lines between nodes to represent their relations. Conceptual learning also includes changes to existing concepts in addition to the acquisition of new ones. Students with misguided ideas in fields like biology and physics need to recognize and resolve their misconceptions. One teaching method proceeds by showing students how their current outlooks conflict with real-world observations.

The term concept has a slightly different meaning in the fields of business and marketing, where it refers to a structured idea or plan. A business concept is a concise framework of how to run a business, while a marketing concept is a guiding strategy or philosophy about how to reach customers and fulfill their needs.

In the field of aesthetics, conceptual art is an art form that challenges traditional aesthetic ideals by focusing on underlying ideas and concepts rather than visual appearance or material craftsmanship. For example, Joseph Kosuth's One and Three Chairs presents a real chair alongside a photograph of a chair and a dictionary definition of the word chair, examining the relations among language, picture, and referent. Conceptual art is distinct from concept art, which refers to artworks that explore new ideas for films, video games, and other media, such as preliminary drawings of characters or landscapes.

== See also ==
- Concept and object – Philosophical distinction by Gottlob Frege
- Conceptual blending – Theory of cognition
- Conceptual framework – Method of organizing information
- Conceptual model – Theoretical framework
- Formal concept analysis – Method of deriving an ontology
- General Concept Lattice – Model of concept hierarchies
