= Condition of possibility =

Concept in Kantian philosophy

In philosophy, condition of possibility (German: Bedingungen der Möglichkeit) is a concept made popular by the German philosopher Immanuel Kant, and is an important part of his philosophy.

A condition of possibility is a necessary framework for the possible appearance of a given list of entities. It is often used in contrast to the unilateral causality concept, or even to the notion of interaction. For example, consider a cube made by an artisan. All cubes are three-dimensional. If an object is three-dimensional, then it is an extended object. But extension is an impossibility without space. Therefore, space is a condition of possibility because it is a necessary condition for the existence of cubes to be possible. Note, however, that space did not cause the cube, but that the artisan did, and that the cube and space are distinct entities, so space is not part of the definition of cube.

Gilles Deleuze presented the distinction between the phenomenon (as apparition, i.e. what appears just insofar as it appears, without any reference to an underlying essence) and the conditions of its appearance as a dichotomy that Kant developed in contradistinction to the classical phenomenon/noumenon dichotomy, e.g. as it appears in Plato's thought between the appearance and the underlying essence or Idea that it participates in. From Plato to Descartes, what was presented by the senses was deemed illusory and degenerate. It was believed that the perceptions ought to be overcome to grasp the thing-in-itself, the essential essence, also known as Plato's allegory of the cave. With Kant comes a transition in philosophy from this dichotomy to the dichotomy of the apparition/conditions-of-appearance. There is no longer any higher essence behind the apparition. It is what it is, a brute fact, and what one must now examine is the conditions that are necessary for its appearance. Immanuel Kant does just this in the Transcendental Aesthetic, when he examines the necessary conditions for the synthetic a priori cognition of mathematics. But Kant was a transitional thinker, so he still maintains the phenomenon/noumenon dichotomy, but what he did achieve was to render Noumena as unknowable and irrelevant.

Foucault would come to adapt it in a historical sense through the concept of "episteme":

what I am attempting to bring to light is the epistemological field, the épistémè in which knowledge, envisaged apart from all criteria having reference to its rational value or to its objective forms, grounds its positivity and thereby manifests a history which is not that of its growing perfection, but rather that of its conditions of possibility; in this account, what should appear are those configurations within the space of knowledge which have given rise to the diverse forms of empirical science. Such an enterprise is not so much a history, in the traditional meaning of that word, as an 'archaeology'.
