= John Corcoran (logician) =

American logician (1937–2021)

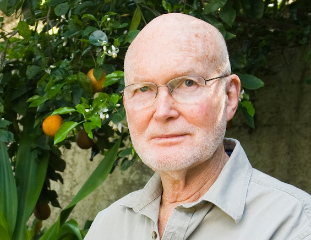
- Born: March 20, 1937; Baltimore, Maryland, U.S.
- Died: January 8, 2021 (aged 83)
- Education: Johns Hopkins University
- Known for: Interpretation of Aristotle's Prior Analytics, reconstruction of Boole's original works, work on logic, work on mathematical logic, character-string theory, subregular polyhedra
- Scientific career
- Fields: Logic, history of logic, philosophy of logic, mathematical logic, philosophy of mathematics, epistemology, ontology, linguistics
- Workplaces: University at Buffalo (SUNY)
- Doctoral advisor: Robert McNaughton
- Doctoral students: Stewart Shapiro

John Corcoran (/ˈkɔːrkərən/ KOR-kər-ən; March 20, 1937 – January 8, 2021) was an American logician, philosopher, mathematician, and historian of logic. He is best known for his philosophical work on concepts such as the nature of inference, relations between conditions, argument-deduction-proof distinctions, the relationship between logic and epistemology, and the place of proof theory and model theory in logic. Nine of Corcoran's papers have been translated into Spanish, Portuguese, Persian, and Arabic; his 1989 "signature" essay was translated into three languages. Fourteen of his papers have been reprinted; one was reprinted twice.

His work on Aristotle's logic of the Prior Analytics is regarded as being highly faithful both to the Greek text and to the historical context. It is the basis for many subsequent investigations. (Note: It was adopted for the 1989 translation of the Prior Analytics by Robin Smith and for the 2009 translation of the Prior Analytics, Book A by Gisela Striker. A bibliography of Corcoran's publications on Aristotle's logic is available at "John Corcoran". ResearchGate..)

His mathematical results on definitional equivalence of formal character-string theories, sciences of strings of characters over finite alphabets, are foundational for logic, formal linguistics, and computer science.

== Education and career ==
Corcoran graduated from the Advanced College Preparatory Program (the "A Course") of the Baltimore Polytechnic Institute in 1956 and received the BES in Mechanical Engineering in 1959 from the Johns Hopkins University, where he received the PhD in Philosophy in 1963. His post-doctoral studies in mathematics were at Yeshiva University in 1964 and at the University of California Berkeley in 1965. His dissertation topic was Generative Structure of Two-valued Logics.

Corcoran's first logic teacher was Albert L Hammond. Corcoran studied Plato and Aristotle with Ludwig Edelstein. His next two logic teachers were Joseph Ullian and Richard Wiebe. Corcoran's dissertation supervisor was Robert McNaughton. At Yeshiva University in New York City Corcoran studied with Raymond Smullyan and Martin Davis. Corcoran's first tenure-track position was at the University of Pennsylvania, where his dissertation supervisor was a Professor of Computer and Information Science.

Corcoran was Professor of Philosophy, University at Buffalo (SUNY) from 1970 to 1973; Associate Professor of Philosophy, University at Buffalo between 1970 and 1973; Assistant Professor of Linguistics, University of Pennsylvania between 1965 and 1969; Member of Linguistics Group, IBM Research Center between 1963 and 1964 He has also served as a visiting professor at the University of Santiago de Compostela and at the University of Michigan.

== Scholarly work ==
Corcoran's work in history of logic involves most of the discipline's productive periods. He has discussed Aristotle, the Stoics, William of Ockham, Giovanni Girolamo Saccheri, George Boole, Richard Dedekind, Gottlob Frege, Charles Sanders Peirce, Clarence Irving Lewis, the American Postulate Theorists, Alfred Tarski, Willard Van Orman Quine, and Warren Goldfarb.

His 1972 interpretation of Aristotle's Prior Analytics, proposed independently by Timothy Smiley at about the same time, has been found to be more faithful than previous interpretations both to the Greek text and to the historical context. It has formed the basis for subsequent investigations by Edgar Andrade, George Boger, Manuel Correia, Paolo Crivelli, Newton da Costa, Catarina Dutilh, Paolo Fait, Nicolas Fillion, James Gasser, Klaus Glashoff, John Martin, Mary Mulhern, Michael Scanlan, Robin Smith, Neil Tennant, and others. It was adopted for the 1989 translation of the Prior Analytics by Robin Smith and for the 2009 translation of the Prior Analytics Book A by Gisela Striker.

His 1980 critical reconstruction of Boole's original 1847 system revealed previously unnoticed gaps and errors in Boole's work and established the essentially Aristotelian basis of Boole's philosophy of logic. A 2003 article provides a systematic comparison and critical evaluation of Aristotelian logic and Boolean logic; it also reveals the centrality of wholistic reference in Boole's philosophy of logic. According to Corcoran, Boole fully accepted and endorsed Aristotle's logic. Boole did not dispute one point that Aristotle made, but he did "go under, over, and beyond" Aristotle's logic by 1) providing it with mathematical foundations involving equations, 2) extending the class of problems it could treat—to assessing validity he added solving equations, and 3) expanding the range of applications it could handle—e.g. from propositions having only two terms to those having arbitrarily many.

More specifically, Boole agreed with what Aristotle said; Boole's 'disagreements', if they might be called that, concern what Aristotle did not say. First, in the realm of foundations, Boole reduced Aristotle's four propositional forms to one form, that of equations—by itself a revolutionary idea. Second, in the realm of logic's problems, Boole's addition of equation solving to logic—another revolutionary idea—involved Boole's doctrine that Aristotle's rules of inference (the "perfect syllogisms") must be supplemented by rules for equation solving. Third, in the realm of applications, Boole's system could handle multi-term propositions and arguments whereas Aristotle could handle only two-termed subject-predicate propositions and arguments. For example, Aristotle's system could not deduce "No quadrangle that is a square is a rectangle that is a rhombus" from "No square that is a quadrangle is a rhombus that is a rectangle" or from "No rhombus that is a rectangle is a square that is a quadrangle".

His collaboration with Alfred Tarski in the late 1970s and early 1980s led to publications on Tarski's work and to the 2007 article Notes on the Founding of Logics and Metalogic: Aristotle, Boole, and Tarski, which traces Aristotelian and Boolean ideas in Tarski's work and which confirms Tarski's status as a founding figure in logic on a par with Aristotle and Boole.

His work in philosophy of logic focuses on the nature of logic, the role of logic in inquiry, the conceptual structure of logic, the metaphysical and epistemological presuppositions of logic, the nature of mathematical logic and the gaps between logical theory and mathematical practice. His mathematical logic treats propositional logics, modal logics, identity logics, syllogistic logics, the logic of first-order variable-binding term operators, second-order logics, model theory, and the theory of strings – a discipline which is foundational in all areas of logic and which provides essential background for all of his other mathematical work. In philosophy of mathematics Corcoran has been guided by a nuanced and inclusionary Platonism which strives to do justice to all aspects of mathematical and logical experience including those aspects emphasized by competing philosophical perspectives such as logicism, constructivism, deductivism, and formalism. Although several of his philosophical papers presuppose little history or mathematics, his historical papers often involve either original philosophy (e.g. his recent BSL article "Schemata") or original mathematics (e.g. his 1980 HPL article "Categoricity"). He has referred to the mathematical dimension of his approach to history as mathematical archaeology. His philosophical papers often involve original historical research. He has been guided by the Aristotelian principle that the nature of modern thought is sometimes best understood in light of its historical development, a view that he attributes to Arthur Lovejoy's History of Ideas Program at Johns Hopkins University and in which he has been encouraged by the American philosopher and historian Peter Hare.

== Death ==
Corcoran died on January 8, 2021, at the age of 83.

== Service to the profession ==
- Co-founder with George Weaver of Philadelphia Logic Colloquium 1966
- Founder of Buffalo Logic Colloquium 1970.
- Chair of Buffalo Logic Colloquium 1970 to present with interruptions.
- Founding member of the Editorial Board, History and Philosophy of Logic 1980–present.
- Regular reviewer for Mathematical Reviews 1969–present.
- Occasional reviewer for Philosophy of Science, Bulletin of Symbolic Logic, and Journal of Symbolic Logic.
- Occasional referee for various logic journals.
- Organizer of four conferences:
  - Ancient Logic (Corcoran, Kretzmann, Mueller, et al.) 1972
  - Nature of Logic (Tarski, Putnam, Friedman, Jech, Vesley, Goodman, et al.) 1973
  - Church Symposium (Church, Davis, Henkin, Rogers) 1990
  - Conference on Gaps between Logical Theory and Mathematical Practice (Shapiro, Scanlan, McLarty, Weaver, Tiezsen, Kearns, et al.) 2001.
- Sponsor of Alonzo Church for Doctor Honoris Causa at the University at Buffalo 1990.
- Board of Editorial Advisors, Cambridge Dictionary of Philosophy 2012–present.

== Honors and awards ==
- Festschrift special double issue of History and Philosophy of Logic 1999 (Eds. M. Scanlan and S. Shapiro);
- Exceptional Scholar Award from the University at Buffalo 2002;
- Doctor Honoris Causa from University of Santiago de Compostela (Spain) 2003;
- Corcoran Symposium, University of Santiago de Compostela (Spain) 2003.
- Corcoran Colloquium, University at Buffalo, October 2010.

== Bibliography ==
Books

- Corcoran, John (2009). "Aristotle's Demonstrative Logic". History and Philosophy of Logic. 30: 1–20.
- Corcoran, John (2009). "Aristotle's Logic at the University of Buffalo's Department of Philosophy". Ideas y Valores: Revista Colombiana de Filosofía. 140 (August 2009): 99–117. http://www.revistas.unal.edu.co/index.php/idval/article/viewFile/12581/13183

Articles

- Three Logical Theories. Philosophy of Science. 36 (1969): 153–177.
- Completeness of an Ancient Logic. Journal of Symbolic Logic. 37 (1972): 696–702.
- Gaps Between Logical Theory and Mathematical practice. In Bunge, M., Ed. Methodological Unity of Science. Dordrecht: Kluwer. 1973. 23–50.
- Meanings of Implication. Dialogos. 9 (1973): 59–76. Reprinted in R. Hughes, Ed., Philosophical companion to first order logic. Indianapolis: Hackett. 1993. Spanish translation by J. M. Sagüillo, Agora, 5 (1985): 279–294.
- Aristotle's Natural Deduction System. In Ancient Logic and its Modern Interpretations. Ed. J. Corcoran, Dordrecht: Kluwer, 1974. 85–131.
- Remarks on Stoic Deduction. Ibid., 169–181.
- String Theory. Journal of Symbolic Logic. 39 (1974): 625–37. With W. Frank, and M. Maloney.
- Logical Structures of Ockham's Theory of Supposition. Franciscan Studies. 38 (1978): 161–83. With J. Swiniarski.
- Crossley on Mathematical Logic. Philosophia. 8 (1978): 79–94. Spanish translation by A. Garciadiego, Mathesis, X (1988): 133–150. With S. Shapiro.
- Categoricity. History and Philosophy of Logic. 1 (1980): 187–208. Reprinted in S. Shapiro, Ed., The Limits of Logic, Aldershot, England: Dartmouth Publishing Company. 1996.
- Boole's Criteria of Validity and Invalidity. Notre Dame Journal of Formal Logic. 21 (1980): 609–639. With S. Wood. Reprinted in J. Gasser, Ed. Boole Anthology. Dordrecht: Kluwer. 2000.
- Introduction and analytical index. In Tarski, A. Logic, Semantics, Metamathematics. Second ed. Edited by J. Corcoran. Trans. J. H. Woodger. Indianapolis: Hackett. 1983.
- Contemporary Relevance of Ancient Logical Theory. Philosophical Quarterly. 32 (1982): 76–86. With M. Scanlan.
- Argumentations and Logic. Argumentation. 3 (1989): 17–43., Spanish translation by R. Fernandez and J. Sagüillo, Agora, 13/1 (1994): 27–55.
- Review of Alfred Tarski: Collected Papers. 4 Vols. Edited by S. Givant and R. McKenzie. Basel: Birkhäuser. 1986. Mathematical Reviews 91h:01101, 2, 3, 4. 1991.
- The Founding of Logic. Ancient Philosophy. 14 (1994): 9–24.
- Information-theoretic logic, in Truth in Perspective edited by C. Martínez, U. Rivas, L. Villegas-Forero, Ashgate Publishing Limited, Aldershot, England (1998) 113–135.
- Second-Order Logic. In the "Church Memorial Volume", Logic, Meaning, and Computation: Essays in Memory of Alonzo Church edited by M. Zeleny and C.A. Anderson., Kluwer Publishing Company, Dordrecht, Holland. 1998.
- Aristotle's Prior Analytics and Boole's Laws of Thought. History and Philosophy of Logic. 24 (2003): 261–288.
- Schemata: the Concept of Schema in the History of Logic. Bulletin of Symbolic Logic. 12 (2006): 219–40.
- C. I. Lewis: History and Philosophy of Logic. Transactions of the C. S. Peirce Society. 42 (2006) 1–9.
- Corcoran, John (21 September 2008). "Schema". In Zalta, Edward N. (ed.). Stanford Encyclopedia of Philosophy (Fall 2008 ed.). ISSN 1095-5054. OCLC 429049174.
- Review of "Aristotle, Prior Analytics: Book I, Gisela Striker (translation and commentary), Oxford UP, 2009, 268pp., $39.95 (pbk), ISBN 978-0-19-925041-7." in the Notre Dame Philosophical Reviews, 2010.02.02.
- "The Absence of Multiple Universes of Discourse in the 1936 Tarski Consequence-Definition Paper", History and Philosophy of Logic. 32 (2011): 359–80. Co-author José Miguel Sagüillo. http://www.tandfonline.com/doi/abs/10.1080/01445340.2011.577145#.UksmOD_-kQs
- "Existential Import Today: New Metatheorems; Historical, Philosophical, and Pedagogical Misconceptions". History and Philosophy of Logic. 36 (2014): 39–61. Co-author Hassan Masoud. http://www.tandfonline.com/doi/full/10.1080/01445340.2014.952947
- "Deductions and Reductions Decoding Syllogistic Mnemonics" Entelekya Logico-Metaphysical Review 2 (1):5-39 (2018). Co-authors Daniel Novotný & Kevin Tracy.

For a complete list see John Corcoran's homepage. Some of his papers are available online: https://buffalo.academia.edu/JohnCorcoran
