= Benacerraf =

Benacerraf (Hebrew: בנאסרף Ben-Aseraf) is a surname. Notable people with the surname include:

- Baruj Benacerraf (1920–2011), Venezuelan immunologist
- Beryl Benacerraf (1949–2022), American radiologist and obstetrics researcher
- Margot Benacerraf (1926–2024), Venezuelan film director
- Paul Benacerraf (1930–2025), French-born American philosopher

== See also ==
- Benacerraf's epistemological problem
- Benacerraf's identification problem
