= Structuralism (philosophy of mathematics) =

Structuralism is a theory in the philosophy of mathematics that holds that mathematical theories describe structures of mathematical objects. Mathematical objects are exhaustively defined by their place in such structures. Consequently, structuralism maintains that mathematical objects do not possess any intrinsic properties but are defined by their external relations in a system. For instance, structuralism holds that the number 1 is exhaustively defined by being the successor of 0 in the structure of the theory of natural numbers; and, by generalization of this example, that any natural number is defined by its respective place in that theory. Other examples of mathematical objects might include lines and planes in geometry, or elements and operations in abstract algebra.

Structuralism is an epistemologically realistic view in that it holds that mathematical statements have an objective truth value. However, its central claim only concerns the kind of entity a mathematical object is, rather than the kind of existence mathematical objects or structures have (i.e., their ontology). The kind of existence that mathematical objects have would depend on that of the structures in which they are embedded; different sub-varieties of structuralism make different ontological claims in this regard.

Structuralism in the philosophy of mathematics is particularly associated with Paul Benacerraf, Geoffrey Hellman, Michael Resnik, Stewart Shapiro and James Franklin.

== Historical motivation ==
The historical motivation for the development of structuralism derives from a fundamental problem of ontology. Since medieval times, philosophers have argued as to whether the ontology of mathematics contains abstract objects. In the philosophy of mathematics, an abstract object is traditionally defined as an entity that:

(1) exists independently of the mind;
(2) exists independently of the empirical world; and
(3) has eternal, unchangeable properties.

Traditional mathematical Platonism maintains that some set of mathematical elements—natural numbers, real numbers, functions, relations, systems—are such abstract objects. Contrarily, mathematical nominalism denies the existence of any such abstract objects in the ontology of mathematics.

In the late 19th and early 20th century, a number of anti-Platonist programs gained in popularity. These included intuitionism, formalism, and predicativism. By the mid-20th century, however, these anti-Platonist theories had a number of their own issues. This subsequently resulted in a resurgence of interest in Platonism. It was in this historic context that the motivations for structuralism developed. In 1965, Paul Benacerraf published an influential article entitled "What Numbers Could Not Be". Benacerraf concluded, on two principal arguments, that set-theoretic Platonism cannot succeed as a philosophical theory of mathematics.

Firstly, Benacerraf argued that Platonic approaches do not pass the ontological test. He developed an argument against the ontology of set-theoretic Platonism, which is now historically referred to as Benacerraf's identification problem. Benacerraf noted that there are elementarily equivalent, set-theoretic ways of relating natural numbers to pure sets. However, if someone asks for the "true" identity statements for relating natural numbers to pure sets, then different set-theoretic methods yield contradictory identity statements when these elementarily equivalent sets are related together. This generates a set-theoretic falsehood. Consequently, Benacerraf inferred that this set-theoretic falsehood demonstrates it is impossible for there to be any Platonic method of reducing numbers to sets that reveals any abstract objects.

Secondly, Benacerraf argued that Platonic approaches do not pass the epistemological test. Benacerraf contended that there does not exist an empirical or rational method for accessing abstract objects. If mathematical objects are not spatial or temporal, then Benacerraf infers that such objects are not accessible through the causal theory of knowledge. The fundamental epistemological problem thus arises for the Platonist to offer a plausible account of how a mathematician with a limited, empirical mind is capable of accurately accessing mind-independent, world-independent, eternal truths. It was from these considerations—the ontological argument, and the epistemological argument—that Benacerraf's anti-Platonist critiques motivated the development of structuralism in the philosophy of mathematics (though see below regarding Platonistic varieties of the latter).

== Varieties ==
Stewart Shapiro divides structuralism into three major schools of thought. These schools are referred to as the ante rem, the in re, and the post rem.

- Ante rem structuralism ("before the thing"), or abstract structuralism or abstractionism (Note: Not to be confused with abstractionist Platonism.) (particularly associated with Michael Resnik, Stewart Shapiro, Edward Zalta, Bob Hale and Crispin Wright, and Øystein Linnebo) has a similar ontology to Platonism (see also modal neo-logicism). Structures are held to have a real, albeit abstract and immaterial, existence. As such, it faces the standard epistemological problem, as noted by Benacerraf, of explaining the interaction between such abstract structures and flesh-and-blood mathematicians. Several attempts to meet this challenge have been advanced: Resnik and Shapiro, for example, propose that the requisite knowledge of abstract mathematical structures is obtained via constructing systems of axioms, which provide implicit definitions of the relevant structures—obviating, thereby, any need for contact between mind and abstracta; alternatively, and perhaps most successfully, Linsky and Zalta (working together), and Balaguer (separately), have developed an approach termed plenitudinous platonism (or "full-blooded" platonism), wherein it is posited that all mathematical objects that possibly could exist actually do exist—hence, no contact with said abstracta need ever occur: every internally consistent mathematical theory would accurately describe some collection of (actually existing) mathematical objects.
- In re structuralism ("in the thing"), or modal structuralism (particularly associated with Geoffrey Hellman), is the equivalent of Aristotelian realism (realism in truth value, but anti-realism about abstract objects in ontology). Structures are held to exist inasmuch as some concrete system exemplifies them; or, for the modal structuralist, inasmuch as it is possible that they could so exist. This incurs the usual issues that some perfectly legitimate structures might accidentally happen not to exist, and that a finite physical world might not be "big" enough to accommodate some otherwise legitimate structures. (Note: The specifically modal version of this approach is subject to the latter issue—that the world may not be able to accommodate structures past a certain (finite) size—but not the former (since the mere possibility of instantiation is, for the modal structuralist, enough).) The Aristotelian realism of James Franklin is also an in re structuralism, arguing that structural properties such as symmetry are instantiated in the physical world and are thus perceivable. In reply to the problem of uninstantiated structures that are too big to fit into the physical world, Franklin points to the fact that other sciences can also deal with uninstantiated universals; for example, the science of color can deal with a shade of blue that happens not to occur on any real object.
- Post rem structuralism ("after the thing"), or eliminative structuralism (particularly associated with Paul Benacerraf), is anti-realist about structures in a way that parallels nominalism. Like nominalism, the post rem approach denies the existence of abstract mathematical objects with properties other than their place in a relational structure. According to this view, mathematical systems exist, and have structural features in common; if something is true of a structure, it will be true of all systems exemplifying the structure. However, it is merely instrumental to talk of structures being "held in common" between systems: they in fact have no independent existence.

== See also ==
- Abstract object theory
- Foundations of mathematics
- Univalent foundations
- Aristotelian realist philosophy of mathematics

Precursors

- Nicolas Bourbaki

== Bibliography ==
- Franklin, James (2014). An Aristotelian Realist Philosophy of Mathematics: Mathematics as the Science of Quantity and Structure. Palgrave Macmillan. ISBN 978-1-137-40072-7.
- Resnik, Michael (1982). "Mathematics as a Science of Patterns: Epistemology". Noûs. 16 (1): 95–105. doi:10.2307/2215419. JSTOR 2215419.
- Resnik, Michael (1997). Mathematics as a Science of Patterns. Clarendon Press. ISBN 978-0-19-825014-2.
- Shapiro, Stewart (1997). Philosophy of Mathematics: Structure and Ontology. Oxford University Press. doi:10.1093/0195139305.001.0001. ISBN 978-0-19-513930-3.
