= Charles Parsons (philosopher) =

American philosopher (1933–2024)

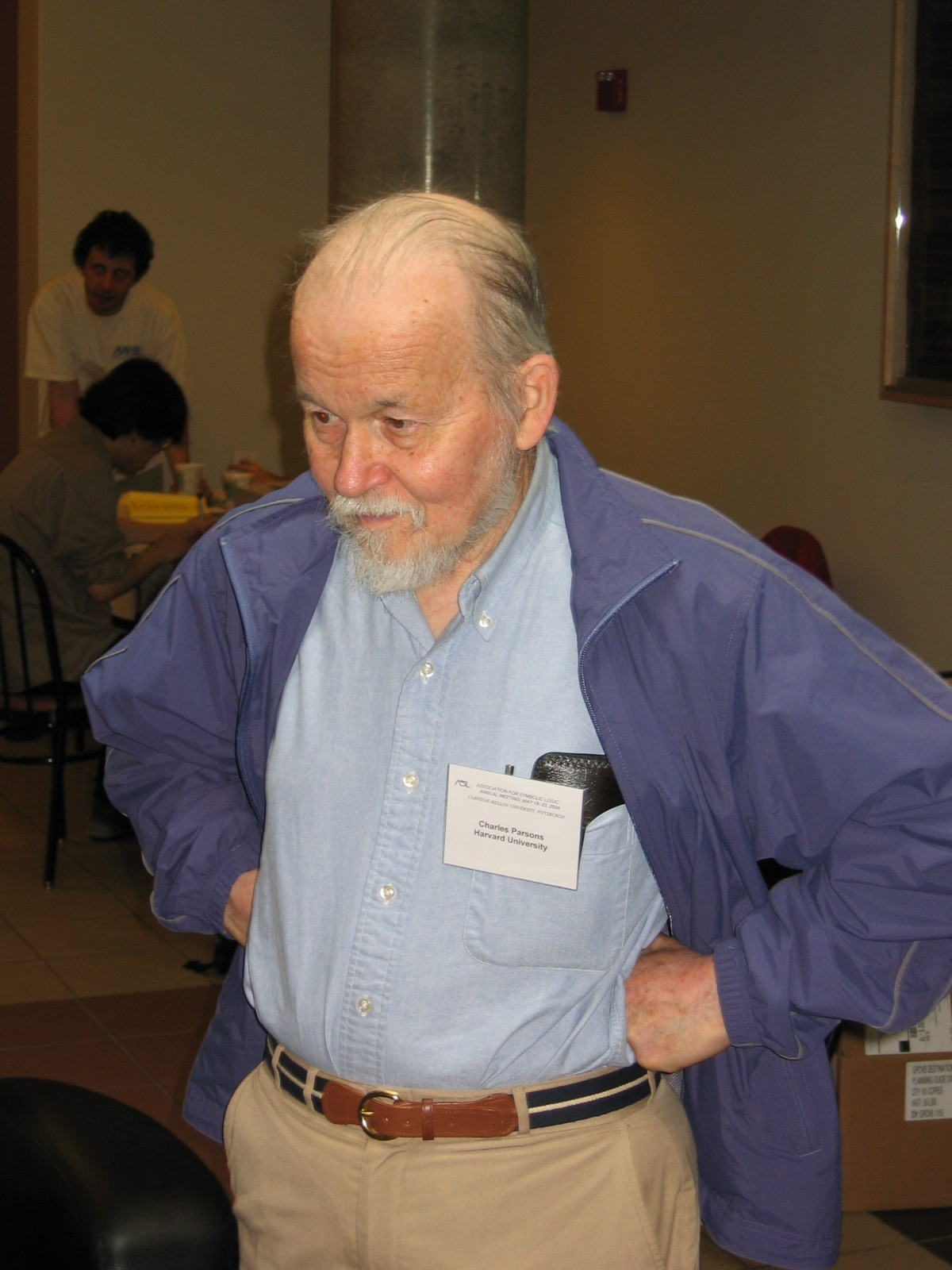
- Parsons in 2004
- Born: Charles Dacre Parsons; April 13, 1933; Cambridge, Massachusetts, U.S.
- Died: April 19, 2024 (aged 91); Cambridge, Massachusetts, U.S.
- Father: Talcott Parsons

Education
- Education: Harvard University (Ph.D., 1961)
- Doctoral advisor: Burton Dreben; W. V. O. Quine

Philosophical work
- Era: Contemporary philosophy
- Region: Western philosophy
- School: Analytic
- Institutions: Cornell University; Harvard University; Columbia University
- Doctoral students: James Higginbotham, Michael Levin, Øystein Linnebo, Peter Ludlow, Gila Sher
- Main interests: Philosophy of mathematics
- Notable ideas: The distinction between "intuition-of" and "intuition-that"

Charles Dacre Parsons (April 13, 1933 – April 19, 2024) was an American philosopher best known for his work in the philosophy of mathematics and the study of the philosophy of Immanuel Kant. He was professor emeritus at Harvard University. In a 2014 review of one of his books, Stewart Shapiro and Teresa Kouri said of Parsons: "It surely goes without saying that [he] is one of the most important philosophers of mathematics in our generation".

== Life and career ==
Born on April 13, 1933, Charles Dacre Parsons was a son of Harvard sociologist Talcott Parsons. He earned his Ph.D. in philosophy at Harvard University in 1961, under the direction of Burton Dreben and Willard Van Orman Quine. He taught for many years at Columbia University before moving to Harvard University in 1989. He retired in 2005 as the Edgar Pierce professor of philosophy, a position formerly held by Quine.

Parsons was an elected Fellow of the American Academy of Arts and Sciences and the Norwegian Academy of Science and Letters.

Among his doctoral students were Michael Levin, James Higginbotham, Peter Ludlow, Gila Sher, and Øystein Linnebo.

In 2017, Parsons gave the Gödel Lecture, titled "Gödel and the Universe of Sets".

Parsons died in Cambridge, Massachusetts, on April 19, 2024, at the age of 91.

== Philosophical work ==
In addition to his work in logic and the philosophy of mathematics, Parsons was an editor, with Solomon Feferman and others, of the posthumous works of Kurt Gödel. He has also written on historical figures, especially Immanuel Kant, Gottlob Frege, Kurt Gödel, and Willard Van Orman Quine.

== Selected publications ==
=== Books ===
- 1983. Mathematics in Philosophy: Selected Essays. Ithaca, N.Y.: Cornell Univ. Press.
- 2008. Mathematical Thought and its Objects. Cambridge Univ. Press.
- 2012. From Kant to Husserl: Selected Essays. Cambridge, Massachusetts, and London: Harvard Univ. Press.
- 2014a. Philosophy of Mathematics in the Twentieth Century: Selected Essays. Cambridge, Massachusetts, and London: Harvard Univ. Press.

=== Articles ===
- 1987. "Developing Arithmetic in Set Theory without infinity: Some Historical Remarks". History and Philosophy of Logic, vol. 8, pp. 201–213.
- 1990a. "The Uniqueness of the Natural Numbers". Iyyun, vol. 39, pp. 13–44. ISSN 0021-3306.
- 1990b. "The Structuralist View of Mathematical Objects". Synthese, vol. 84 (3), pp. 303–346.
- 2014b. "Analyticity for Realists". In Interpreting Gödel: Critical Essays, ed. J. Kennedy. Cambridge University Press, pp. 131–150.
