= Victor Keats =

Victor Abraham Keats FRHS is a British chess historian and fellow of the Royal Historical Society. He has written a number of books on the history of chess with particular reference to the contributions of Jews to the game.

== Career ==
Keats trained as a quantity surveyor and later became the curator of a chess collection which he expanded. He received his M.Phil. from University College, London in 1994 for a dissertation on the subject of "Chess in Jewish History and Hebrew Literature" which was published in book form by Magnes Press of Jerusalem in 1995.

In the same year his three volume history of chess was published by Oxford Academia which developed his ideas of the contributions made by Jews to the history of the game in more detail including the first translation into English of Thomas Hyde's De Ludis Orientalibus (1694). The usefulness of the assembled source material and translations was acknowledged by Irving Finkel in Times Higher Education who, however, was troubled by the author's scholarly standards which he described as containing a troubling "liberal carelessness". George Steiner, writing in The Observer, was more complimentary, describing Keats' soul as "blessed with chess mania" but acknowledging that the "layout, typography and structure [of the books] are as labyrinthine, as baroque and beyond mere reason as is chess itself" and summarising by saying that the three volumes represent a "mad feast of learning".

== Selected publications ==
- Chessmen for Collectors. Batsford, London, 1985. ISBN 0713417188 (Published in the United States as The Illustrated Guide to World Chess Sets, St. Martin's Press, New York, 1986. ISBN 0312407998)
- Chess in Jewish History and Hebrew Literature. Magnes Press, Jerusalem, 1995. ISBN 9652239151
- Chess, Jews and History. Oxford Academia Publishers, Oxford, 1995. ISBN 1899237003
- Chess, its Origins. Oxford Academia Publishers, Oxford, 1995. ISBN 1899237011
- Chess among the Jews. Oxford Academia Publishers, Oxford, 1995.
- Memoirs of a Chessnut. Edwin Mellen Press, Lewiston, 1996. ISBN 0773487778
