= Michael Levin (philosopher) =

American philosopher (born 1943)

- Born: 21 May 1943 (age 83)
- Spouse: Margarita Levin

Education
- Doctoral advisor: Charles Parsons

Philosophical work
- Era: Contemporary philosophy
- Region: Western philosophy
- School: Analytic philosophy Reliabilism
- Main interests: Epistemology, philosophy of race
- Notable ideas: Heritability of intelligence

Michael Levin (/ˈlɛvɪn/; born 21 May 1943) is an American philosopher and writer. A professor emeritus of philosophy at City College of New York, he has published on topics of metaphysics, epistemology, race, homosexuality, animal rights, the philosophy of archaeology, the philosophy of logic, philosophy of language, and the philosophy of science.

Levin's central research interests are in epistemology (reliabilism and Gettier problems) and the philosophy of race.

== Education ==
Levin graduated from Stuyvesant High School in 1960, earned his Bachelor of Arts degree from Michigan State University in 1964, and studied at Columbia University where he received a doctoral degree in 1969. His dissertation was titled "Wittgenstein's Philosophy of Mathematics".

== Philosophical, political and social views ==
Levin advocates reliabilism and heritability of racial differences.

=== Economics ===
For Christmas 2000, Levin published a libertarian critique of Dickens's popular novella A Christmas Carol in which he defends Scrooge as "an entrepreneur whose ideas and practices benefit his employees, society at large, and himself."

=== Homosexuality ===
Levin has questioned the morality, wisdom, and naturalness of homosexuality. He argues that homosexual acts are abnormal because their participants are not using their sexual organs for what they are designed, and that this abnormality must be a source of unhappiness, even though it may go unrecognized. In his book Sexual Desire (1986), the philosopher Roger Scruton criticized Levin's attempt to show that homosexuality is abnormal, calling it absurd. Timothy Murphy has criticized Levin's arguments about homosexuality in detail. Murphy states in Gay Science (1997) that while Levin "more or less accepts that there is a strong biological basis for homoerotic orientation" he nevertheless believes that discrimination against gay people may be defensible on several grounds, including the possibility that there is a biologically based dislike of homosexuality.

=== Feminism ===
Feminist Susan Faludi writes in Backlash: The Undeclared War Against American Women (1991) that Levin's 1988 book Feminism and Freedom characterizes feminism as an "antidemocratic, if not totalitarian, ideology" without a single redeeming feature.

=== Race ===
Levin agrees with Arthur Jensen and Richard Lynn that white people score higher on IQ tests than black people due to genetic differences—a view that has been criticized by scholars such as Leon Kamin of Princeton University.

Levin defended this view in an exchange in the journal Philosophy of the Social Sciences.

Throughout the 1990s Levin frequently wrote about race differences in intelligence, biology, and morality for the white nationalist publication American Renaissance. The Southern Poverty Law Center classifies him as an "unabashed white supremacist."

Animal Rights

Levin has criticized theories of animal rights, and argues that attempts to assign rights to animals don't establish moral equivalence between humans and nonhuman animals. He further argues that human nature itself is what drives humanity to dominate animals, believing it is wired into a person's genetic material.

In his exchange with Joseph Fulda, Levin rejected proposals that would acknowledge both humans and animals have rights of differing strengths. He maintains a broad objection to animal-rights theory. Levin also rejects the view that speciesism shares similarities with racism or sexism, asserting instead that species membership is morally relevant.

Critics of such views argue that grounding moral status in characteristics associated with humans and intelligence (such as rationality or moral agency) face the argument of "marginal cases". This argument notes that many humans lack rationality (infants, young children, people with profound intellectual disabilities, people with advanced dementia, people in persistent vegetative states and individuals with severe brain injuries) but are regarded as rights-holders with moral status. Philosopher Peter Singer instead argues that sentience and capacity to suffer rather than species membership is the relevant basis for moral consideration.

== Personal life ==
Like Michael H. Hart, he is one of the few Jewish supporters of white nationalism.

Levin is married to philosopher of mathematics, Margarita Levin.

== Selected publications ==
=== Books ===
- Metaphysics and the Mind-Body Problem, Oxford University Press, 1979. ISBN 0-19-824415-0.
- Feminism and Freedom, Transaction Publishers, 1987. ISBN 978-0-88738-670-1
- Why Race Matters: Race Differences and What They Mean, Praeger Publishers, 1997. ISBN 0-275-95789-6.
- (with Laurence M. Thomas) Sexual Orientation and Human Rights, Rowman and Littlefield, 1999. ISBN 0847687708.

=== Articles and essays ===
- Levin, M. E. 1968. Fine, Mathematics, and Theory Change. The Journal of Philosophy 65, no. 2: pages 52–56.
- Levin, M. E. 1971. Length Relativity. The Journal of Philosophy 68, no. 6: pages 164–174.
- Levin, M. E. 1973. On explanation in archaeology: a rebuttal to Fritz and Plog. American Antiquity 38, no. 4: pages 387–395.
- Levin, M. E. 1974. Kant's Derivation of the Formula of Universal Law as an Ontological Argument. Kant-Studien 65, no. 1-4: pages 50–66.
- Levin, M. E. 1975. Kripke's argument against the identity thesis. The Journal of Philosophy 72, no. 6: pages 149–167.
- Levin, M. E. 1975. Relativity, Spatial and Ontological. Nous: pages 243–267.
- Levin, M. E. 1976. The extensionality of causation and causal-explanatory contexts. Philosophy of Science 43, no. 2: pages 266–277.
- Levin, M. E. 1976. On the ascription of functions to objects, with special reference to inference in archaeology. Philosophy of the Social Sciences 6, no. 3: page 227.
- Levin, M. E. 1977. Animal rights evaluated. The Humanist 37, no. 4: pages 12–15.
- Levin, M. E., and M. R. Levin. 1977. Flagpoles, shadows and deductive explanation. Philosophical Studies 32, no. 3: pages 293–299.
- Levin, M. E., and M. R. Levin. 1978. The independence results of set theory: An informal exposition. Synthese 38, no. 1: pages 1-34.
- Levin, M. E., and M. R. Levin. 1978. Lavoisier's Slow Burn. Philosophy of Science 45, no. 4: pages 626–629.
- Levin, M. E. 1979. On theory-change and meaning-change. Philosophy of Science 46, no. 3: pages 407–424.
- Levin, M. E. 1979. Quine's View (s) of Logical Truth. Essays on the Philosophy ofW. V. Quine: pages 45–67.
- Levin, M. E. 1979. The universalizability of moral judgments revisited. Mind 88, no. 1: page 115.
- Levin, M. E. 1979. Forcing and the Indeterminacy of Translation. Erkenntnis 14, no. 1: pages 25–32.
- Levin, M. E. 1979. Ahab as Socratic Philosopher: The Myth of the Cave Inverted. ATQ: The American Transcendental Quarterly 41: pages 61–73.
- Levin, M. E., and M. R. Levin. 1979. The modal confusion in Rawls' original position. Analysis 39, no. 2: page 82.
- Levin, M. E. 1980. Reverse discrimination, shackled runners, and personal identity. Philosophical Studies 37, no. 2: pages 139–149.
- Levin, M. E. 1981. Equality of opportunity. The Philosophical Quarterly 31, no. 123: pages 110–125.
- Levin, M. E. 1981. Is racial discrimination special? The Journal of Value Inquiry 15, no. 3: pages 225–234.
- Levin, M. E. 1981. Phenomenal Properties. Philosophy and Phenomenological Research 42, no. 1: pages 42–58.
- Levin, M. E. 1984. Why Homosexuality is Abnormal. The Monist 67, no. 2, Sociobiology and Philosophy: pages 251–283.
- Levin, M. E. 1984. Why we believe in other minds. Philosophy and Phenomenological Research 44, no. 3: pages 343–359.
- Levin, M. E. 1982 "The Case for Torture." Newsweek 7 Jun. 1982.
- Levin, M. E. nd. In Defense of Scrooge , a libertarian apology in favor of the popular protagonist of Dickens' A Christmas Carol
- Levin, M. E. 1995. Tortuous Dualism, Journal of Philosophy, 1995.[20]
- Levin, M. E. 1998. Putnam on Reference and Constructible Sets, British Journal for Philosophy of Science, 1998.[18]
- Levin, M. E. 1999. A Misuse of Bayes' Theorem, Informal Logic, 1999.[19]
- Levin, M. E. 2000. Demons, Possibility and Evidence, NOUS, 2000. ISBN 022666970X.
- Levin, M. E. 2007. Bundling Hume with Kripkenstein. Synthese 155, no. 1: pages 35–64.
- Levin, M. E. 2007. Compatibilism and Special Relativity. The Journal of philosophy 104, no. 9: pages 433–463.

== See also ==
- American philosophy
- Biology and sexual orientation
- List of American philosophers
- Logical truth
