= Robert Stainton =

Canadian-born American philosopher

Robert Stainton FRSC
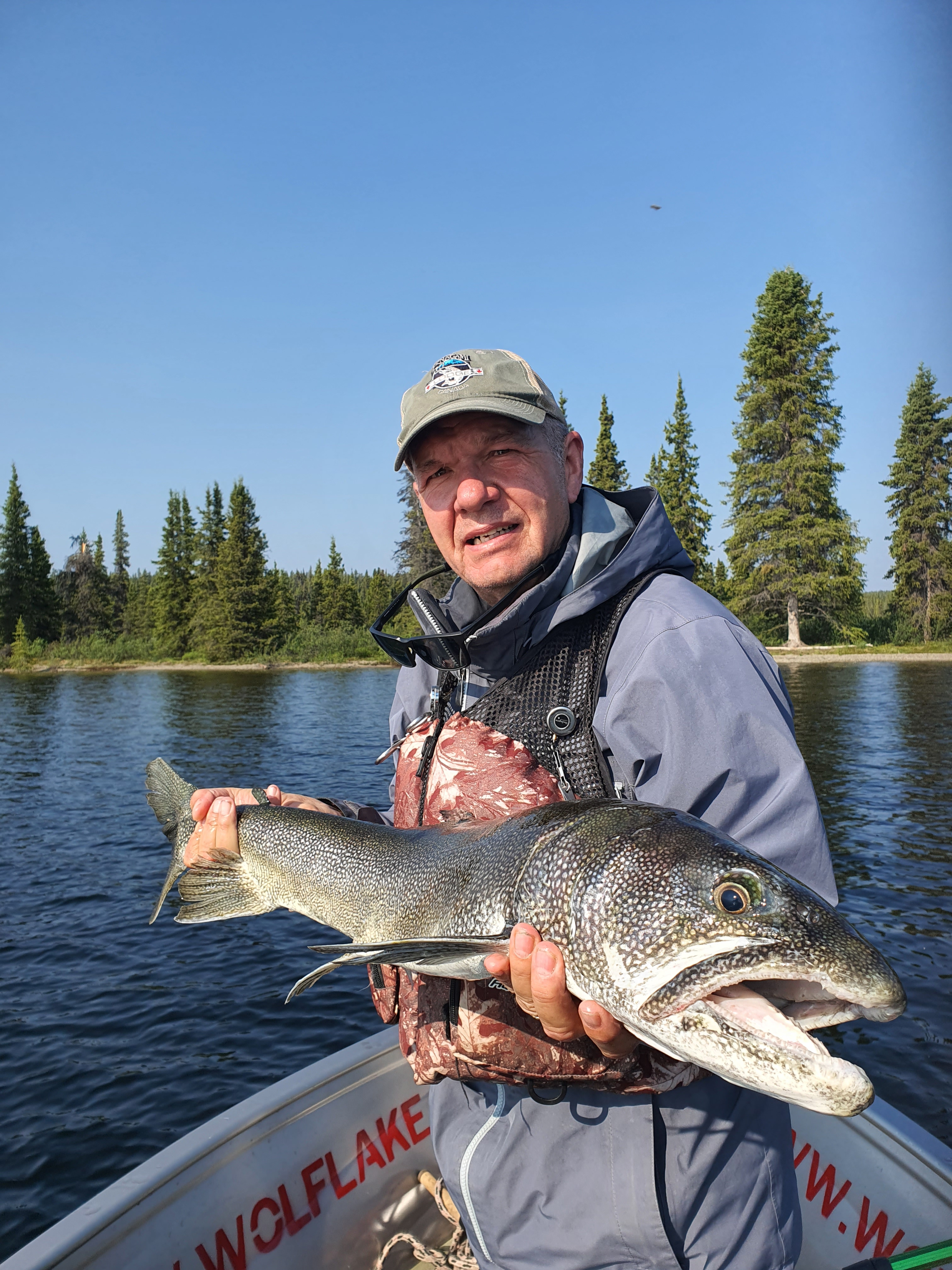
- Born: Robert James Harold Stainton; 1964 (age 61–62); Toronto, Canada

Academic background
- Education: Glendon College of York University (BA, 1987; BA, 1988); MIT (PhD, 1993)
- Thesis: Non-Sentential Assertions (1993)
- Doctoral advisor: Sylvain Bromberger
- Other advisors: Noam Chomsky, James Higginbotham

Academic work
- Era: Contemporary philosophy
- Discipline: Philosophy, linguistics
- Region: Western philosophy
- School or tradition: Analytic philosophy
- Institutions: University of Western Ontario

Robert Stainton (born 1964) is a Canadian philosopher and linguist who is Distinguished University Professor at the University of Western Ontario. He is known for his works on the philosophy of language, cognitive science/philosophy of the mind, analytic metaphysics/philosophical logic, semantics and pragmatics.

He is currently leading a Social Sciences and Humanities Research Council of Canada (SSHRC) Insight Grant-funded project on The Metaphysics and Epistemology of Languages with Christopher Viger. He is also “a fanatical carp fisher,” as he told Outdoor Canada.

== Selected publications ==
- Words and Thoughts. Oxford University Press, Oxford: 2006. [248 pp.] (Paperback edition, with corrections: 2009.)
- Knowledge and Mind. (With J. Andrew Brook). The MIT Press, Cambridge, MA: 2000. [253 pp.] (Paperback edition: 2001.)
- Philosophical Perspectives on Language. Broadview Press, Peterborough, ON: 1996. [239 pp.]
- Discourse, Structure and Linguistic Choice: The Theory and Applications of Molecular Sememics by T. Price Caldwell. (Co-edited with Oliver Cresswell) Springer, Dordrecht: 2018. [134 pp.]
- Sourcebook in the History of Philosophy of Language: Primary Source Texts from the Pre-Socratics to Mill. (Co-edited with Margaret Cameron and Benjamin Hill). Springer, Dordrecht: 2017. [1102 pp.]
- Linguistic Content: New Essays on the History of Philosophy of Language. (Co-edited with Margaret Cameron). Oxford University Press, Oxford: 2015. [288 pp.]
- Michael Gregory’s Proposals for a Communication Linguistics. (Co-edited with Jessica de Villiers). Editions du GREF, Toronto: 2009. [340 pp.]
- Compositionality, Context and Semantic Values: Essays in Honour of Ernie Lepore. (Co-edited with Christopher Viger) Springer, Dordrecht: 2009. [281 pp.]
- The Achilles of Rationalist Psychology. (Co-edited with Thomas M. Lennon). Springer, Dordrecht: 2008. [289 pp.]
- Ellipsis and Non-Sentential Speech. (Co-edited with Reinaldo Elugardo) Springer, Dordrecht: 2005. [262 pp.]
