= Øystein Linnebo =

Norwegian philosopher

- Born: 1971 (age 54–55)

Education
- Education: University of Oslo; Harvard University
- Doctoral advisor: Charles Parsons

Philosophical work
- Era: Contemporary philosophy
- Region: Western philosophy
- School: Analytic
- Institutions: Birkbeck College, University of London; University of Oslo
- Main interests: Philosophy of logic, philosophy of mathematics, metaphysics, philosophy of language, philosophy of science
- Notable ideas: Abstractionist approach to thin objects

Øystein Linnebo (born 1971) is a Norwegian philosopher. As of 2020 he is currently employed in the Department of Philosophy at the University of Oslo, having earlier held a position as Professor of Philosophy at Birkbeck College, University of London. He is a fellow of the Norwegian Academy of Science and Letters.

== Career ==
Linnebo earned his MA in Mathematics from the University of Oslo in 1995 and his PhD in Philosophy at Harvard University in June 2002.

Linnebo's primary areas of concentration are philosophy of logic, philosophy of mathematics, metaphysics, as well as philosophy of language and philosophy of science. He is known for his numerous publications in many top international journals in his field including: The Review of Symbolic Logic, Dialectica, The Journal of Philosophy, Notre Dame Journal of Formal Logic as well as editing a special edition of Synthese. Additionally, he is the author of the articles "Plural Quantification" and "Platonism in the Philosophy of Mathematics" in the Stanford Encyclopedia of Philosophy. He is also an "Area Editor" for philosophy of mathematics on PhilPapers.

In addition to being a Professorial fellow at the Northern Institute of Philosophy, University of Aberdeen he has also been awarded many grants. Most recently he led a research project as part of a European Research Council Starting Grant entitled "Plurals, Predicates, and Paradox: Towards a Type-Free Account" which ran from January 2010 until December 2013.

In 2018, he published Thin Objects: An Abstractionist Account, an abstractionist approach to thin objects.

Since 2022, he is visiting professor at the University of Italian Switzerland.
