= James Higginbotham =

American linguist & philosopher (1941–2014)

James Higginbotham FBA
- Born: 17 August 1941; Chattanooga, Tennessee, U.S.
- Died: 25 April 2014 (aged 72); Los Angeles, California, U.S.

Education
- Education: Columbia University

Philosophical work
- Era: Contemporary philosophy
- Region: Western philosophy
- School: Analytic
- Notable students: Robert Stainton
- Main interests: Philosophy of language, logic, linguistics

James Higginbotham (/ˈhɪɡɪnbɒðəm/; 17 August 1941 – 25 April 2014) was a philosopher and linguist who was a distinguished professor of linguistics and philosophy at the University of Southern California. He taught previously at the Massachusetts Institute of Technology, Columbia University, and at the University of Oxford as a Fellow of Somerville College, Oxford.

== Education and career ==
Higginbotham earned a Ph.D. in philosophy at Columbia University in 1973 under the supervision of Sidney Morgenbesser and Charles Parsons. He taught at Columbia until 1980, when he moved to MIT as associate professor of philosophy and linguistics. In 1993, he became Professor of General Linguistics at Oxford University, a position he held until moving to University of Southern California in 2000.

In 1993, he became the first male Fellow of Somerville College, Oxford. He was also the Vera Brittain Visiting Fellow at Somerville College in 2009.

He was elected a Fellow of the British Academy in 1995 and the American Academy of Arts & Sciences in 2011.

Higginbotham edited the Journal of Philosophy (along with others) when he was on the faculty at Columbia University. He was also the editor of the OUP series in cognitive science and the associate editor of Pragmatics and Cognition.

== Philosophical and linguistic works ==
- Professor Higginbotham published many working papers in linguistics, Linguistic Inquiry, Mind & Language, Linguistics and Philosophy, etc.
- He authored volumes published by Oxford University Press and Routledge, and he edited a volume on the semantics of events published by OUP.
