= Michael Resnik =

American philosopher of mathematics

- Born: March 20, 1938 (age 88); New Haven, Connecticut

Education
- Education: Yale University; Harvard University

Philosophical work
- Era: Contemporary philosophy
- Region: Western philosophy
- School: Analytic philosophy
- Main interests: Philosophy of mathematics, epistemology
- Notable ideas: Mathematical structuralism (abstract variety)

Michael David Resnik (/ˈrɛznɪk/; born March 20, 1938) is a leading contemporary American philosopher of mathematics.

== Biography ==
Resnik obtained his B.A. in mathematics and philosophy at Yale University in 1960, and his PhD in Philosophy at Harvard University in 1964. He wrote his thesis on Frege. He was appointed Associate Professor at the University of North Carolina at Chapel Hill in 1967, Professor in 1975, and University Distinguished Professor in 1988. He is Professor Emeritus of University of North Carolina at Chapel Hill and currently resides in rural Chatham County, North Carolina.

== Publications ==
=== Books ===
- Elementary Logic. 1970.
- Frege and the Philosophy of Mathematics. 1980.
- Choices: An Introduction to Decision Theory. 1987.
- Gefwert, Christoffer (1995). Mathematical Objects and Mathematical Knowledge. Ashgate. ISBN 978-1-85521-638-9.
- Mathematics As a Science of Patterns. 1997.

=== Journal articles ===
- "On Skolem's Paradox". Journal of Philosophy. 1966.
- "On the Philosophical Significance of Consistency Proofs". Journal of Philosophical Logic. 1974.
- "Frege and Analytic Philosophy: Facts and Speculations". Midwest Studies. 1981.
- Resnik, Michael D. (1981). "Mathematics as a Science of Patterns: Ontology and Reference". Noûs. 15 (4): 529–550. doi:10.2307/2214851. JSTOR 2214851.
- Resnik, Michael D. (1982). "Mathematics as a Science of Patterns: Epistemology". Noûs. 16 (1): 95–105. doi:10.2307/2215419. JSTOR 2215419.
- Resnik, Michael D. (1985). "Logic: Normative or Descriptive?". Philosophy of Science. 52 (2): 221–238. doi:10.1086/289241. S2CID 122441386.
- "Impartial Welfarism and the Concept of a Person". Erkenntnis. 1986.
- "Second-order Logic Still Wild!". Journal of Philosophy. 1988.
- "Between Mathematics and Physics". Philosophy of Science Association Proceedings. 1990.
- "A Naturalized Epistemology for Mathematical Objects". Philosophica. 1990.
- "Immanent Truth". Mind. 1991.
- "Proof as a Source of Truth". Proof and Knowledge in Mathematics, ed. By Detlefsen. 1992.
- "Scientific vs. Mathematical Realism: The Indispensability Argument". Philosophia Mathematica. 1995.
- "Structural Relativity". Philosophia Mathematica. 1996.
- "On Positing Mathematical Objects". Frege: Importance and Legacy, M. Schirn, Ed. 1996.
