= Gila Sher =

American philosopher

- Born: Israel

Education
- Education: Hebrew University of Jerusalem; Columbia University
- Doctoral advisor: Charles Parsons

Philosophical work
- Era: Contemporary philosophy
- Region: Western philosophy
- School: Analytic philosophy
- Main interests: Philosophy of logic, epistemology, metaphysics
- Notable ideas: Foundational holism

Gila Sher is an American logician and professor of philosophy at the University of California, San Diego. She has worked extensively in the theory of truth and philosophy of logic. Sher is a leading advocate of foundational holism, a holistic theory of epistemology.

== Education and career ==
In 1989, Sher earned a Ph.D. in philosophy from Columbia University, where she studied the works of Willard Quine and Alfred Tarski. Her dissertation was directed by Charles Parsons.

Since 2017, Sher has been an editor of The Journal of Philosophy, and from 2012 to 2017, she was an editor-in-chief of the journal Synthese. Sher has also served as the president of the International Society for Formal Ontology since 2017.

== Philosophical work ==
Her early work focused on Tarski's definition of truth. Her reformulation of this definition has been influential in modern truth theory. Her dissertation was expanded into the book The Bounds of Logic (1991), in which Sher also formalized definitions for unique second-order quantifiers such as 'most'.

Sher has pursued research into logical positivism and logical foundationalism. She has argued that strict-ordering foundationalism, in the vein of Rudolf Carnap, is untenable, supporting Quine's argument from Two Dogmas of Empiricism. She has, however, resisted the mainstream move toward all-or-nothing and semantic holism. The former view she considers unexplanatory, and the latter she considers untenable (see: Jerry Fodor).

Sher has also written more generally on the metaphysics of truth. She put forward a criticism of John Etchemendy in the article "Did Tarski Commit Tarski's Fallacy?" This article defended Tarskian truth theory from the radical attack posed by Etchemendy. She is also a leading Quine scholar, writing about the place of philosophy in his theory of naturalized epistemology.

== Books ==
- 1991. The Bounds of Logic, MIT.
- 2000. Between Logic and Intuition: Essays in Honor of Charles Parsons. Editor (with R. Tieszen), Cambridge.
- 2016. Epistemic Friction: An Essay on Knowledge, Truth, and Logic. Oxford University Press.
