= Principle of humanity =

Principle in philosophy and rhetoric

In philosophy and rhetoric, the principle of humanity states that when interpreting another speaker we must assume that his or her beliefs and desires are connected to each other and to reality in some way, and attribute to him or her "the propositional attitudes one supposes one would have oneself in those circumstances". The principle of humanity was named by Richard Grandy (then an assistant professor of philosophy at Princeton University) who first expressed it in 1973.

== See also ==
- Principle of charity
