= Burton Dreben =

American philosopher (1927–1999)

- Born: Burton Spencer Dreben; September 27, 1927; Boston, Massachusetts, U.S.
- Died: July 11, 1999 (aged 71); Boston, Massachusetts, U.S.

Education
- Education: Harvard University
- Academic advisor: W. V. O. Quine

Philosophical work
- Era: 20th-century philosophy
- Region: Western philosophy
- School: Analytic philosophy
- Institutions: University of Chicago; Harvard University; Boston University
- Doctoral students: Warren Goldfarb; Charles Parsons; T. M. Scanlon
- Notable students: James F. Conant; Michael Friedman
- Main interests: Mathematical logic History of analytic philosophy
- Notable ideas: Historical reconstruction of analytic philosophy

Burton Spencer Dreben (/ˈdrɛbən/; September 27, 1927 – July 11, 1999) was an American philosopher specializing in mathematical logic. A Harvard graduate who taught at his alma mater for most of his career (where he retired as Edgar Pierce Professor of Philosophy Emeritus), he published little but was a teacher and a critic of the work of his colleagues (Floyd & Shieh 2001).

== Education and career ==
Harvard University awarded Dreben an A.B. and an A.M. in 1949 and 1955, respectively. He taught at the University of Chicago, 1955–56, at Harvard 1956–90, and at Boston University for the remainder of his life. He was a Fulbright Fellow at Oxford University 1950–51, a member of the Harvard Society of Fellows 1952–55, a Guggenheim Fellow from 1957–58, and a member of the American Academy of Arts and Sciences from 1963.

At Harvard, he was Dean of the Graduate School of Arts and Sciences 1973–75, a special assistant to the Dean of the Faculty of Arts and Sciences with oversight over the academic tenure process and Chair of the Society of Fellows 1976–90.

At the Association for Symbolic Logic, he was twice a treasurer and an editor of its journal.

Dreben was a highly influential teacher of philosophy. The Harvard Crimson described him as

"A mathematical logician by training, his writings set new standards of clarity for the historical study of 20th-century philosophy. His lectures at Harvard and later at Boston University, where he taught from 1991 until his death, were famous for their wit, bravado, and intellectual excitement, attracting students and faculty alike and shaping several generations of philosophers. His mastery of the texts of 20th-century analytic philosophy was unmatched."

Dreben became known for his close reading and detailed comments on the draft writings of his Harvard colleagues W. V. O. Quine, John Rawls, Hilary Putnam, Stanley Cavell, Charles Parsons, and Warren Goldfarb. Quine often thanked Dreben in print for his advice and corrections and dedicated Pursuit of Truth to Dreben. Dreben also had a significant influence on many students and junior faculty at Harvard, including Warren Goldfarb, James F. Conant, Michael Friedman, and others.

In his later years, Dreben was a guest lecturer in Scandinavia, Israel, and Europe, giving seminars on the nature and significance of 20th-century philosophy. After retiring from Harvard in 1991, he taught at Boston University.

During the student revolt of the late 1960s, Dreben helped mediate the conflicts and disputes between Harvard students and administration. Among his students was Harry R. Lewis.

== Philosophical work ==
Dreben was both an expert logician, and careful historian of ideas and interpreter of historical texts. In the 1950s, he found a copy of Jacques Herbrand's Ph.D. thesis, submitted to the University of Paris in 1929 and thought lost. Dreben found a number of significant errors in the thesis, as well as evidence of haste and carelessness in its preparation. In particular, in Herbrand's proof, a crucial lemma was fatally flawed, but Dreben found another way of proving the essential conclusions of the thesis. Dreben's introduction to the translation of Herbrand's thesis in van Heijenoort (1967) includes a concise description of his work on Herbrand's writings.

In the 1970s, Dreben and Warren Goldfarb wrote a book on the decision problem.

From 1978 onwards, Dreben gave a series of lectures at Harvard which had as their primary topics the works of Ludwig Wittgenstein and W. V. O. Quine. Dreben took from Wittgenstein the lesson that philosophers always went wrong when they tried to provide general accounts of reality, epistemology, or metaphysics. He was in agreement with Wittgenstein's later view that philosophical problems mostly arise when language goes on holiday. Dreben took the history of philosophy as itself a proof of Wittgenstein's thesis that much philosophizing is nonsense; Dreben attempted to show how the history of philosophy is a history of people talking past one another.

Dreben interpreted Quine as attempting to show that philosophy does not provide the foundations of science. According to Dreben's interpretation of Quine, philosophy at its best merely answers a number of general questions from within science itself. However, Dreben saw even in Quine a tendency to generalize most successfully resisted by the later Wittgenstein, whose unflagging alertness to specifics Dreben took as a model.

== Personal life ==
Dreben was first married to Massachusetts Judge Raya Spiegel Dreben, with whom he had two children. He later married the philosopher Juliet Floyd.

== Works ==
=== Book ===
- 1979. The Decision Problem: Solvable Classes of Quantificational Formulas (with W. D. Goldfarb), Addison-Wesley, 1979. ISBN 0-201-02540-X

=== Thesis ===
- 1949. "Deductive completeness of n-valued quantification theory", A.B. Thesis, Harvard University.

=== Articles ===
- 1952. "On the completeness of quantification theory", Proceedings of the National Academy of Sciences of the United States of America, vol. 38, pp. 1047–52.
- 1957. "Relation of m-valued quantificational logic to 2-valued quantificational logic", Summaries of Talks Presented at the Summer Institute for Symbolic Logic, Institute for Defense Analysis, Communications Research Division, Princeton, pp. 303–4.
- 1957. "Systematic treatment of the decision problem", Summaries of Talks Presented at the Summer Institute for Symbolic Logic, Institute for Defense Analysis, Communications Research Division, Princeton, p. 363.
- 1962. "Solvable Surányi subclasses: an introduction to the Herbrand theory", Proceedings of a Harvard Symposium on Digital Computers and Their Applications, Annals of the Computation Laboratory of Harvard University, vol. 31, Harvard University Press, pp. 32–47.
- 1962. "Classification of AEA formulas by letter atoms" (with A. S. Kahr and Hao Wang), Bulletin of the American Mathematical Society, vol. 68, pp. 528–32.
- 1963. "Three solvable cases" (with J. S. Denton, Jr.), Notices of the American Mathematical Society, vol. 10, p. 590.
- 1963. "False lemmas in Herbrand" (with S. O. Aanderaa and P. B. Andrews), Bulletin of the American Mathematical Society, vol. 69, pp. 699–706.
- 1964. "Herbrand analyzing functions" (with S. O. Aanderaa), Bulletin of the American Mathematical Society, vol. 70, pp. 697–8.
- 1964. "Henry Maurice Sheffer" (with H. D. Aiken, W. V. O. Quine, Hao Wang, and H. A. Wolfson), Harvard University Gazette, vol. 60, pp. 87–8.
- 1966. "A supplement to Herbrand" (with J. S. Denton, Jr.), Journal of Symbolic Logic, vol. 31, pp. 393–8.
- 1967. "The Craig interpolation lemma" (with H. Putnam), Notre Dame Journal of Formal Logic, vol. 8, pp . 229-33.
- 1970. "Herbrand-style consistency proofs" (with J. S. Denton, Jr.), in A. Kino, J. Myhill, and R. E. Vesley (eds.), Intuitionism and Proof Theory, North-Holland, pp. 419–33.
- 1971. "Notes E-I", in W. D. Goldfarb (ed.), Jacques Herbrand Logical Writings, D. Reidel, pp. 190–201. ISBN 90-277-0176-8
- 1971. "Note J" (with W. D. Goldfarb), in W. D. Goldfarb (ed.), Jacques Herbrand Logical Writings, D. Reidel, pp. 201–2. ISBN 90-277-0176-8
- 1971. "Note N" (with W. D. Goldfarb), in W. D. Goldfarb (ed.), Jacques Herbrand Logical Writings, D. Reidel, pp. 265–71. ISBN 90-277-0176-8
- 1983. "Academic freedom and tenure: corporate funding of academic research" (with J. J. Thomson, E. Holtzman, B. R. Kreiser), Academe, vol. 69, pp. 18–23.
- 1986. "Introductory note to 1929, 1930 and 1930a" (with J. van Heijenoort), in S. Feferman, J. W. Dawson, S. C. Kleene, G. H. Moore, R. M. Solovay, and J. van Heijenoort (eds.), Kurt Gödel Collected Works, Volume I: Publications 1929-1936, Oxford University Press, pp. 44–59. ISBN 0-19-503964-5
- 1990. "Quine", in R. B. Barrett and R. F. Gibson (eds.), Perspectives on Quine, Blackwell, pp. 81–95. ISBN 0-631-16135-X
- 1991. "Tautology: how not to use a word" (with Juliet Floyd), Synthese, vol. 87, pp. 23–49.
- 1992. "Putnam, Quine — and the facts", Philosophical Topics, vol. 20, pp. 293–315.
- 1994. "In mediis rebus", Inquiry, vol. 37, pp. 441–7.
- 1995. "Cohen’s Carnap, or subjectivity is in the eye of the beholder", in K. Gavroglu, J. Stachel and M. W. Wartofsky (eds.), Science, Politics and Social Practice: Essays on Marxism and Science, Philosophy of Culture and the Social Sciences in Honor of Robert S. Cohen, Kluwer, pp. 27–42. ISBN 0-7923-2989-9
- 1996. "Quine and Wittgenstein: the odd couple", in R. Arrington and H. Glock (eds.), Wittgenstein and Quine, Routledge, pp. 39–61. ISBN 0-415-09676-6
- 1997. "Hilbert and set theory" (with A. Kanamori), Synthese, vol. 110, pp. 77–125.
- 2002. "On Rawls and political liberalism", in S. Freeman (ed.), The Cambridge Companion to Rawls, Cambridge University Press, pp. 316–46. ISBN 0-521-65167-0
- 2004. "Quine on Quine", in R. F. Gibson Jr. (ed.), The Cambridge Companion to Quine, Cambridge University Press, pp. 287–93. ISBN 0-521-63056-8

=== Review articles ===
- 1950. Review: "Axiom schemes for m-valued functional calculi of first order. Part I. Definition of axiom schemes and proof of plausibility" by J. B. Rosser and A. R. Turquette, Journal of Symbolic Logic, vol. 14, pp. 259–60.
- 1951. Review: "Axiom schemes for m-valued functional calculi of first order. Part II. Deductive completeness" by J. B. Rosser and A. R. Turquette, Journal of Symbolic Logic, vol. 16, p. 269.
- 1955. Review: "A finitary metalanguage for extended basic logic" by John Myhill, Journal of Symbolic Logic, vol. 20, p. 81. doi:10.2307/2268100
- 1955. Review: "A simplification of basic logic", "A definition of negation in extended basic logic" by F. B. Fitch, Journal of Symbolic Logic, vol. 20, p. 81. doi:10.2307/2268100
- 1959. Review: "Linear reasoning. A new form of the Herbrand-Gentzen theorem", "Three uses of the Herbrand-Gentzen theorem in relating model theory and proof theory" by William Craig, Journal of Symbolic Logic, vol. 24, pp. 243–4.

=== Translations ===
- 2011. "Frege-Wittgenstein correspondence" (with Juliet Floyd), in E. De Pellegrin (ed.), Interactive Wittgenstein: Essays in Memory of Georg Henrik von Wright, Springer, pp. 15–74. ISBN 978-1-4020-9909-0

=== Videos ===
- 1994. In Conversation: W. V. Quine, produced and directed by R. Fara, Centre for Philosophy of Natural and Social Science, London School of Economics.

== See also ==
- American philosophy
