= Richard Grandy =

American philosopher and logician (born 1942)

- Born: 1942 (age 83–84)

Education
- Thesis: On Formalist Philosophies of Mathematics (1968)
- Doctoral advisor: Paul Benacerraf

Philosophical work
- Era: Contemporary philosophy
- Region: Western philosophy
- School: Analytic
- Main interests: Philosophy of logic, metaphysics, epistemology, philosophy of science, philosophy of mathematics, philosophy of language, cognitive science
- Notable ideas: Principle of humanity

Richard Grandy (born 1942) is an American philosopher and logician, who is emeritus professor of philosophy at Rice University.

== Education and career ==
Grandy earned his Ph.D. in philosophy at Princeton University under the direction of Paul Benacerraf. He taught at Princeton University from 1967 to 1974, then at the University of North Carolina, Chapel Hill before moving to Rice University in 1980, where he spent the rest of his career.

== Philosophical work ==
He formulated the principle of humanity, which states that when interpreting another speaker we must assume that his or her beliefs and desires are connected to each other and to reality in some way, and attribute to him or her "the propositional attitudes one supposes one would have oneself in those circumstances".
