= Continuity thesis =

Hypothesis regarding European intellectual history

In the history of ideas, the continuity thesis is the hypothesis that there was no radical discontinuity between the intellectual development of the Middle Ages and the developments in the Renaissance and early modern period. Thus the idea of an intellectual or scientific revolution following the Renaissance is, according to the continuity thesis, a myth. Some continuity theorists point to earlier intellectual revolutions occurring in the Middle Ages, usually referring to the European Renaissance of the 12th century as a sign of continuity.

The continuity thesis has been seen by Paul Freedman and Gabrielle M. Spiegel as characteristic of Medieval studies in North America in the twentieth century. Despite the many points that have been brought up by proponents of the continuity thesis, most scholars still support the traditional view of the Scientific Revolution occurring in the 16th and 17th centuries.

== Duhem ==
The idea of a continuity, rather than contrast between medieval and modern thought, begins with Pierre Duhem, the French physicist and philosopher of science. It is set out in his ten-volume work on the history of science, Le système du monde: histoire des doctrines cosmologiques de Platon à Copernic. Unlike many former historians such as Voltaire and Condorcet, who did not consider the Middle Ages to be of much intellectual importance, Duhem tried to show that the Roman Catholic Church had helped foster the development of Western science. His work was prompted by his research into the origins of statics in which he encountered the works of medieval mathematicians and philosophers such as Nicole Oresme and Roger Bacon. He consequently came to regard them as the founders of modern science since, in his view, they anticipated many of the discoveries of Galileo and later thinkers. Duhem concluded that "the mechanics and physics of which modern times are justifiably proud proceed, by an uninterrupted series of scarcely perceptible improvements, from doctrines professed in the heart of the medieval schools."

== Sarton ==
Another notable supporter of the continuity thesis was George Sarton (1884–1956). In The History of Science and the New Humanism (1931), George Sarton put much stress on the historical continuity of science. Sarton further noted that the development of science stagnated during the Renaissance, due to Renaissance humanism putting more emphasis on form over fact, grammar over substance, and the adoration of ancient authorities over empirical investigation. As a result, he stated that science had to be introduced to Western culture twice: first in the 12th century during the Arabic–Latin translation movement, and again in the 17th century during what became known as the "Scientific Revolution". He said this was due to the first appearance of science being swept away by Renaissance humanism before science had to be re-introduced again in the 17th century.

Sarton wrote in the Introduction to the History of Science:

It does not follow, as so many ignorant persons think, that the mediaeval activities were sterile. That would be just as foolish as to consider a pregnant woman sterile as long as the fruit of her womb was unborn. The Middle Ages were pregnant with many ideas which could not be delivered until much later. Modern science, we might say, was the fruition of mediaeval immaturity. Vesalius, Copernicus, Galileo, Newton were the happy inheritors who cashed in.

We shall not be far wrong in saying that it was Occamism combined with Averroism which prepared the gradual dissolution of mediaeval continuity and the beginning of a new age.

== Franklin and Pasnau ==
More recently the Australian mathematician and historian of science James Franklin has argued that the idea of a European Renaissance is a myth. He characterizes the myth as the view that around the 15th century:

- There was a sudden dawning of a new outlook on the world after 1000 years of darkness.
- Ancient learning was rediscovered.
- New ideas about intellectual inquiry and freedom replaced reliance on authority.
- Scientific investigation replaced the sterile disputes of the schools.

He claims that the Renaissance was in fact a period when thought declined significantly and brought to an end a period of advance in the Late Middle Ages and that the twelfth century was the "real, true, and unqualified renaissance". For example, the rediscovery of ancient knowledge, which the later Italian humanists claimed for themselves, was actually accomplished in the 12th century.

Franklin cites many examples of scientific advances in the medieval period that predate or anticipate later 'discoveries'. For example, the first advances in geometrical optics and mechanics were in the 12th century. The first steps in understanding motion, and continuous variation in general, occurred in the 14th century with the work of the scientists of the Merton School, at Oxford in the 1330s and 1340s. (Franklin notes that there is no phrase in ancient Greek or Latin equivalent to "kilometres per hour"). Nicole Oresme, who wrote on theology and money, devoted much of his effort to science and mathematics and invented graphs, was the first to perform calculations involving probability, and the first to compare the workings of the universe to a clock. Franklin emphasises how much of later thought, not only in science, was built on a foundation of revived scholasticism, not Renaissance humanism.

According to Franklin, little of importance occurs in any other branches of science in the two centuries between Oresme and Copernicus. Like other historians of this period, Franklin attributes the decline to the plague of 1348–1350 (the Black Death), which killed a third of the people in Europe. Johan Huizinga's examination of the period, The Waning of the Middle Ages, suggests a tendency towards elaborate theory of signs, which Franklin compares with the degeneracy of modern Marxism. He cites the late Renaissance naturalist Aldrovandi, who considered his account of the snake incomplete until he had treated it in its anatomical, heraldic, allegorical, medicinal, anecdotal, historical and mythical aspects. He marks the 15th century as coinciding with the decline of literature. Chaucer died in 1400; the next writers that are widely read are Erasmus, More, Rabelais and Machiavelli, just after 1500. "It is hard to think of any writer in English between Chaucer and Spenser who is now read even by the most enthusiastic students. The gap is almost two hundred years." He points to the development of astrology and alchemy in the heyday of the Renaissance.

Franklin concedes that in painting the Renaissance really excelled, but unfortunately, the artistic skill of the Renaissance concealed its incompetence in anything else. He cites Leonardo da Vinci, who was supposed to be good at everything, but who on examination, "had nothing of importance to say on most subjects". (A standard history of mathematics, according to Franklin (E. T. Bell's The Development of Mathematics, 1940), states, "Leonardo's published jottings on mathematics are trivial, even puerile, and show no mathematical talent whatever.") The invention of printing he compares to television, which produced "a flood of drivel catering to the lowest common denominator of the paying public, plus a quantity of propaganda paid for by the sponsors".

The philosopher and historian Robert Pasnau makes a similar claim that "modernity came in the late twelfth century, with Averroes' magisterial revival of Aristotle and its almost immediate embrace by the Latin West."

Pasnau argues that in some branches of 17th-century philosophy, the insights of the scholastic era fall into neglect and disrepute. He disputes the modernist view of medieval thought as subservient to the views of Aristotle. By contrast, "scholastic philosophers agree among themselves no more than does any group of philosophers from any historical period." Furthermore, the almost-unknown period between 1400 and 1600 was not barren but gave rise to vast quantities of material, much of which still survives. That complicates any generalizations about the supposedly novel developments in the 17th century. He claims that the concerns of scholasticism are largely continuous with the central themes of the modern era; that early modern philosophy, though different in tone and style, is a natural progression out of later medieval debates; and that a grasp of the scholastic background is essential to an understanding of the philosophy of Descartes, Locke and others.

== Graham and Saliba ==
In 1973, A. C. Graham criticized the notion of "modern science" and argued, "The question may also be raised whether Ptolemy or even Copernicus and Kepler were in principle any nearer to modern science than the Chinese and the Maya, or indeed than the first astronomer, whoever he may have been, who allowed observations to outweigh numerological considerations of symmetry in his calculations of the month and the year". In 1999, George Saliba, in his review of Toby E. Huff's The Rise of Early Modern Science: Islam, China and the West, also criticised the notion of "modern science" by arguing that one would need to define terms like "modern science" or "modernity". After quoting Graham, Saliba notes that "the empirical emphasis placed by that very first astronomer on the value of his observations set the inescapable course to modern science. So where would the origins of modern science then lie?"

== Grant ==
In The Foundations of Modern Science in the Middle Ages, Edward Grant argues that the origins of modern science lie in the Middle Ages and was due to a combination of four factors:

"Translations into Latin of Greek and Arabic scientific texts in the twelfth and thirteenth centuries; the development of universities, which were uniquely Western and used the translations as the basis of a science curriculum; the adjustments of Christianity to secular learning and the transformation of Aristotle's natural philosophy."

== Hatfield ==
Gary Hatfield, in his "Was the Scientific Revolution Really a Revolution of Science?", argues that while the "Scientific Revolution" of the 17th century did have several individual "revolutions", he does not consider the period to be a "scientific" revolution. Some of his reasons include science still being tied to metaphysics at the time, experimental physics not being separated from natural philosophy until the end of the 18th century, and comparable individual "revolutions" in different sciences continued occurring before and after the 17th century, such as the optical revolution of Faraday and Maxwell.

== Bala ==
Another contrary view has been recently proposed by Arun Bala in his dialogical history of the birth of modern science. Bala proposes that the changes involved in the Scientific Revolution — the mathematical realist turn, the mechanical philosophy, the atomism, the central role assigned to the Sun in Copernican heliocentrism — have to be seen as rooted in multicultural influences on Europe. He sees specific influences in Alhazen's physical optical theory, Chinese mechanical technologies leading to the perception of the world as a machine, the Hindu–Arabic numeral system, which carried implicitly a new mode of mathematical atomic thinking, and the heliocentrism rooted in ancient Egyptian religious ideas associated with Hermeticism. Bala argues that by ignoring such multicultural impacts we have been led to a Eurocentric conception of the Scientific Revolution. Critics note that lacking documentary evidence of transmission of specific scientific ideas, Bala's model will remain "a working hypothesis, not a conclusion".

== See also ==
- Conflict thesis – Concept in history of science
- Renaissance magic – Magical science during the Renaissance
- David Nirenberg – American historian
