= Magnes Press =

Publishing house of the Hebrew University of Jerusalem

- Parent company: Hebrew University of Jerusalem
- Founded: 1929; 97 years ago
- Country of origin: Israel
- Headquarters location: Jerusalem
- Publication types: Books, academic journals
- Official website: magnespress.co.il/en

The Hebrew University Magnes Press, known for short as Magnes Press, is the publishing house of the Hebrew University of Jerusalem.

== History ==
Magnes Press was founded in 1929, four years after the founding of the Hebrew University, and is the oldest university book publishing house in Israel. The publication is named after Yehuda Leib Magnes, the first president of the university.

The initial mission of the publishing house was to produce and distribute in the Land of Israel and the world scientific literature in general and Jewish topics in particular, in Hebrew and English, original and translated, for the use of students and researchers in the scientific community and among the general public. Magnes Press accepts proposals for the publication of books from researchers from all academic institutions in Israel.

Magnes Press is careful about the academic level of the books it publishes through a peer review process, as is customary among university book publishers. After that, the manuscripts that the publisher accepts are brought up for discussion in the academic council of the publisher, which serves as an editor. The scientific council's decisions are presented to the publisher's management, which incorporates commercial and economic considerations into the decision whether to publish.

Magnes Publishing publishes every year about 60 new books and journals in all fields of academic activity in Israel. In addition, it prints reprints and re-editions of previously printed books.

== Journals ==
Some of the scientific journals published by Magnes Press:

- Tarbiz (Hebrew: תרביץ): Jewish studies quarterly
- Shnaton: An Annual for Biblical and Ancient Near Eastern Studies (Hebrew: שנתון לחקר המקרא והמזרח הקדום)
- Perspectives: Revue de l’Université Hébraïque de Jérusalem
- Jerusalem Studies in Jewish Thought (Hebrew: מחקרי ירושלים במחשבת ישראל)
- Jerusalem Studies in Jewish Folklore (Hebrew: מחקרי ירושלים בפולקלור יהודי)
- Jerusalem Studies in Hebrew Literature (Hebrew: מחקרי ירושלים בספרות עברית)
- Iyyun: The Jerusalem Philosophical Quarterly (Hebrew: עיון: רבעון פילוסופי)

== Book series ==
- Beer Sheva: Studies by the Department of Bible and Ancient Near East
- The Bible Project
- Bridges
- Eshkolot: Classical Culture Studies
- Folklore Research Center Studies
- Jewish Population Studies
- Past Tense
- Perry Foundation for Biblical Research series
- Philosophical Classics
- Scripta Hierosolymitana
- The Shorter Jewish Encyclopedia Judaica in Russian
- Yuval: Monograph Series
