= Sylvain Bromberger =

Belgian-born American philosopher of science and language

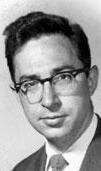
- Bromberger c. 1963
- Born: July 7, 1924; Antwerp, Belgium
- Died: September 16, 2018 (aged 94); Cambridge, Massachusetts, US
- Children: 2

Education
- Education: Columbia University
- Thesis: The Concept of Explanation (1961)
- Doctoral advisor: Morton White
- Other advisors: Nelson Goodman, Willard Van Orman Quine

Philosophical work
- Era: Contemporary philosophy
- Region: Western philosophy
- School: Analytic philosophy
- Institutions: Massachusetts Institute of Technology
- Doctoral students: Scott Soames, Robert Stainton
- Main interests: Philosophy of science, philosophy of language, linguistics, epistemology
- Notable works: On What We Know We Don't Know (1992)
- Notable ideas: Philosophy of explanation, p-predicament

Sylvain Bromberger (July 7, 1924 – September 16, 2018) was a Belgian-born American philosopher of science and language. After fleeing the German occupation of Belgium, he became a philosophy professor in the United States.

His philosophical work focused on the philosophy of science and language, especially the nature of questions and explanations.

Bromberger worked at the Massachusetts Institute of Technology, helping establish their Department of Linguistics and Philosophy. He remained active at MIT until his death.

== Biography ==
=== Early life ===
Bromberger was born on July 7, 1924, in Antwerp, Belgium, to French-speaking Polish Jewish parents. He spoke French and Flemish.

Following Germany's invasion of Belgium, Bromberger, his parents, and his two brothers, fled to France in May 1940. They survived due to the actions of Aristides de Sousa Mendes, a Portuguese consul general. Bromberger dedicated his only book to Sousa Mendes, and served on the board of a foundation recognising him.

In June 1940, the Bromberger family reached Portugal. In December 1940, they sailed to New York aboard the SS Nyassa.

Bromberger thought of himself as a refugee, but not as a Holocaust survivor, preferring to reserve the latter term for survivors of concentration camps.

After reaching New York, he attended the École libre des hautes études, and George Washington High School.

External videos
- An interview with Bromberger from the United States Holocaust Memorial Museum
- Oral history interview with Sylvain Bromberger

=== Military service ===
In 1942, during his first year as an undergraduate, Bromberger was drafted into the US military. He served for three years. In 1945, he was wounded during the invasion of Germany. While recovering, he visited his childhood home in Antwerp.

=== Academic career ===
Bromberger enrolled at Columbia University in 1942, studying physics and the philosophy of science. In 1948, he graduated from Columbia with a Bachelor of Arts degree. After a year of graduate studies at Columbia, Bromberger moved to Harvard University. At Harvard, he studied under Willard Van Orman Quine and Nelson Goodman. In 1961, Bromberger received a PhD in philosophy from Harvard. His thesis, which was supervised by Morton White, was titled "The Concept of Explanation".

From 1955 to 1960, Bromberger lectured in philosophy at Princeton University. From 1960 to 1966, he was an associate professor at the University of Chicago.

==== Massachusetts Institute of Technology ====
Bromberger began work at the Massachusetts Institute of Technology in 1966. His first appointment there was as a visiting scholar in linguistics. In 1967, he was invited to join MIT's philosophy program and became a professor there. Bromberger taught classes on erotetics (the philosophy of questions), linguistics, and theories of explanation.

In 1977, Bromberger helped establish MIT's Department of Linguistics and Philosophy. He headed the philosophy department for several years.

Bromberger supervised Robert Stainton's thesis.

=== Retirement ===
Bromberger retired in 1993. His retirement was marked by a collection of essays titled "The View From Building 20", which featured contributions from Noam Chomsky and Alec Marantz. It was edited by Kenneth Hale and Samuel Jay Keyser.

He was a professor emeritus, and remained active at MIT until his death. He died on September 16, 2018, at the age of 94, in Cambridge, Massachusetts.

=== Personal life ===
Bromberger married his wife, Nancy, in 1949. They had two sons, and three grandchildren.

== Work ==
Bromberger's work focused on epistemology, ignorance, and questions. He also worked on linguistic philosophy, especially phonology and morphology, and worked with Morris Halle.

In the 1960s, Bromberger began work on the nature of "why?" questions. His early work critiqued the Deductive-nomological model, using "flagpole"-type counter examples. His 1966 article "Why-questions" discussed the concept of a p-predicament (the p referring to puzzle), a state in which, although a question has a correct answer, all actual answers to it are known to be false. This article influenced Bas van Fraassen's work on contrastivism.

Later in his career, Bromberger worked on generative linguistics.

Bromberger's 1992 book On What We Know We Don't Know is considered his most important work. It includes his essays on theories, explanations, and questions.

== Works ==
- Bromberger, Sylvain (1992). On What We Know We Don't Know: Explanation, Theory, Linguistics, and How Questions Shape Them. University of Chicago Press. ISBN 9780226075396.
