= Principle of charity =

Interpreting statements in the most rational way possible

In philosophy and rhetoric, the principle of charity or charitable interpretation requires interpreting a speaker's statements in the most rational way possible and, in the case of any argument, considering its best, strongest possible interpretation. In its narrowest sense, the goal of this methodological principle is to avoid attributing irrationality, logical fallacies, or falsehoods to the others' statements when a coherent, rational interpretation of the statements is available. According to Simon Blackburn, "it constrains the interpreter to maximize the truth or rationality in the subject's sayings."

== Application ==
Neil L. Wilson gave the principle its name in 1958–59. Its main area of application, by his lights, is determining the referent of a proper name:

How should we set about discovering the significance which a person attaches to a given name? [...] Let us suppose that somebody (whom I am calling "Charles") makes just the following five assertions containing the name "Caesar." [...]

1. Caesar conquered Gaul. (Gc)
2. Caesar crossed the Rubicon. (Rc)
3. Caesar was murdered on the Ides of March. (Mc)
4. Caesar was addicted to the use of the ablative absolute. (Ac)
5. Caesar was married to Boadicea. (Bc)

[...] And so we act on what might be called the Principle of Charity. We select as designatum that individual which will make the largest possible number of Charles' statements true. [...] We might say the designatum is that individual which satisfies more of the asserted matrices containing the word "Caesar" than does any other individual.

A very early application of this Principle of Charity appears in the Mishnah, the collection of Jewish law redacted in approximately 200 CE. Rabbi Meir addresses the question of how to handle a nonsensical declaration, such as "I vow to donate the value of my leg", the leg not having a legal valuation independent of the body. Rabbi Meir says "A person does not utter a statement for naught", and therefore we must interpret the statement in a way that ascribes a value to the donation and hence meaning to the vow.

Willard Van Orman Quine and Donald Davidson provide other formulations of the principle of charity. Davidson sometimes referred to it as the principle of rational accommodation. He summarized it: "We make maximum sense of the words and thoughts of others when we interpret in a way that optimises agreement." The principle may be invoked to make sense of a speaker's utterances when one is unsure of their meaning. In particular, Quine's use of the principle gives it this latter, wide domain.

Since the time of Quine, other philosophers have formulated at least four versions of the principle of charity. These alternatives may conflict with one another, so which principle to use may depend on the goal of the conversation. The four principles are:

1. The other uses words in the ordinary way;
2. The other makes true statements;
3. The other makes valid arguments;
4. The other says something interesting.

A related principle is the principle of humanity, which states that we must assume that another speaker's beliefs and desires are connected to each other and to reality in some way, and attribute to him or her "the propositional attitudes one supposes one would have oneself in those circumstances" (Daniel Dennett, "Mid-Term Examination", in The Intentional Stance, p. 343).

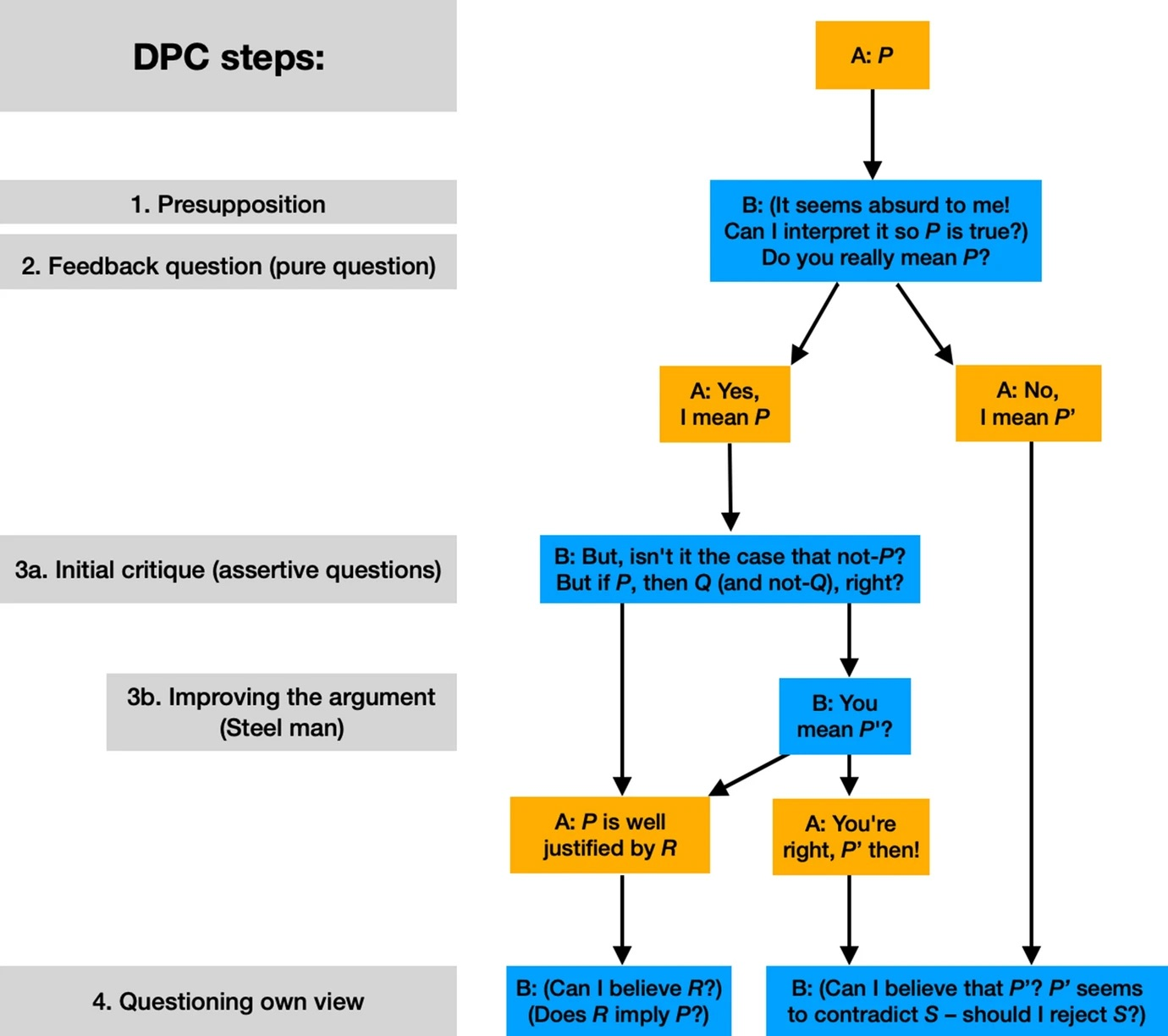
Dialectical principle of charity algorithm

The principle of charity has been criticized and modified several times by various philosophers. Piotr Sikora and Jakub Pruś developed a dialectical account and four-step algorithm, calling it the dialectical principle of charity.

== See also ==
- Cooperative principle
- Good faith
- Hanlon's razor
- Interpretation (philosophy)
- Pardes
- Precautionary principle
- Principle of humanity
- Rule of lenity
- Steelmanning
