= Stewart Shapiro =

American philosopher

- Born: 1951 (age 74–75)

Education
- Education: Case Western Reserve University; University at Buffalo

Philosophical work
- Era: Contemporary philosophy
- Region: Western philosophy
- School: Analytic philosophy
- Main interests: Philosophy of mathematics
- Notable ideas: Mathematical structuralism (abstract variety)

Stewart Shapiro (/ʃəˈpɪəroʊ/; born 1951) was O'Donnell Professor of Philosophy at the Ohio State University until his retirement, and is also distinguished visiting professor at the University of Connecticut. He is a leading figure in the philosophy of mathematics where he defends the abstract variety of structuralism.

== Education and career ==
Shapiro studied mathematics and philosophy as an undergraduate at Case Western Reserve University in 1973. He earned his M.A. in mathematics at the State University of New York at Buffalo in 1975. He transferred to the University at Buffalo Philosophy Department, where three years later he received a Ph.D. His doctoral supervisor was John Corcoran.

He was elected a Fellow of the American Academy of Arts & Sciences in 2021.

== Publications ==
=== Books ===
- Philosophy of Mathematics: Structure and Ontology. Oxford University Press, 1997. ISBN 0-19-513930-5
- Thinking about Mathematics: The Philosophy of Mathematics. Oxford University Press, 2000. ISBN 0-19-289306-8
- Foundations without Foundationalism: A Case for Second-Order Logic. Oxford University Press, 1991. ISBN 0-19-853391-8
- Vagueness in Context. Oxford University Press, 2006. ISBN 0-19-928039-8
- Varieties of Logic. Oxford University Press, 2014. ISBN 978-0199696529

=== Editorships ===
- Intensional Mathematics, Studies in Logic and the Foundations of Mathematics 113, Amsterdam, North Holland Publishing Company, 1985. Contributors: S. Shapiro, J. Myhill, N. D. Goodman, A. Scedrov, V. Lifschitz, R. Flagg, R. Smullyan.
- The Limits of Logic: Higher-Order Logic and the Löwenheim-Skolem Theorem, Routledge, 1996.
- Special issue of Philosophia Mathematica 4(2), devoted to structuralism. Contributors: P. Benacerraf, G. Hellman, B. Hale, C. Parsons, M. Resnik, S. Shapiro. Contributors: P. Benacerraf, G. Hellman, B. Hale, C. Parsons, M. Resnik, S. Shapiro, 1996.
- The Oxford Handbook of Philosophy of Mathematics and Logic. Oxford University Press, 2005. ISBN 0-19-514877-0

== See also ==
- American philosophy
- List of American philosophers
