= Concatenation theory =

Math theory of strings of symbols

Concatenation theory, also called string theory, character-string theory, or theoretical syntax, studies character strings over finite alphabets of characters, signs, symbols, or marks. String theory is foundational for formal linguistics, computer science, logic, and metamathematics, especially proof theory. A generative grammar can be seen as a recursive definition in string theory.

The most basic operation on strings is concatenation: connecting two strings to form a longer string whose length is the sum of the lengths of those two strings. ABCDE is the concatenation of AB with CDE, in symbols, ABCDE = AB ^ CDE. Strings and concatenation of strings can be treated as an algebraic system with some properties resembling those of the addition of integers. In modern mathematics, this system is called a free monoid.

In 1956 Alonzo Church wrote: "Like any branch of mathematics, theoretical syntax may, and ultimately must, be studied by the axiomatic method". Church was evidently unaware that string theory already had two axiomatizations from the 1930s: one by Hans Hermes and one by Alfred Tarski. Coincidentally, the first English presentation of Tarski's 1933 axiomatic foundations of string theory appeared in 1956 – the same year that Church called for such axiomatizations. As Tarski himself noted using other terminology, serious difficulties arise if strings are construed as tokens rather than types in the sense of Peirce's type-token distinction.
