= Geoffrey Hellman =

American professor and philosopher (born 1943)

- Born: August 16, 1943 (age 83)

Education
- Education: Harvard University

Philosophical work
- Era: Contemporary philosophy
- Region: Western philosophy
- School: Analytic philosophy
- Main interests: Philosophy of mathematics
- Notable ideas: Mathematical structuralism (modal variety)

Geoffrey Hellman (born August 16, 1943) is an American professor and philosopher. He is Professor of Philosophy at the University of Minnesota in Minneapolis, Minnesota. He obtained his B.A. (1965) and Ph.D. (1972) degrees in philosophy from Harvard University. He was elected to the American Academy of Arts and Sciences in 2007.

He has also performed extensively as a classical concert pianist. Some of his performances can be accessed from his home-page, http://hellman.umn.edu/.

== Books ==
- Hellman, Geoffrey (1989). Mathematics without Numbers. Towards a Modal-Structural Interpretation. The Clarendon Press, Oxford University Press, New York, 1989.
- Mathematics and Its Logics: Philosophical Essays (Cambridge University Press, 2021).
- Mathematical Structuralism, with Stewart Shapiro (Cambridge University Press, 2019).
- Varieties of Continua: From Regions to Points and Back, with Stewart Shapiro (Oxford University Press, 2018).
- Hilary Putnam on Mathematics and Logic, coedited with Roy Cook (Springer Verlag, 2018).
- Quantum Measurement: Beyond Paradox, Minnesota Studies in Philosophy of Science (University of Minnesota Press, 1998) co-edited with Richard Healey.

== Selected works ==
- “Extending the Iterative Conception of Set: a Height-Potentialist Perspective”, in Mathematics and Its Logics: Philosophical Essays (op. cit).
- “On the Gödel-Friedman Program”, in Mathematics and Its Logics: Philosophical Essays (op. cit).
- “If ‘If-Then’ Then What?”, in Mathematics and Its Logics: Philosophical Essays (op. cit).
- ”Extendability and Paradox” (with Roy Cook), in Putnam on Mathematics and Logic, eds. Roy Cook and Geoffrey Hellman (Springer Verlag, 2018).
- Predicativity and Regions-based Continua (with Stewart Shapiro), in a volume of essays honoring Solomon Feferman, Feferman on Logic and Foundations eds. Wilfried Sieg and Gerhard Jaeger (Springer Verlag, 2018).
- “Reflections on Reflection in a Multiverse” in a Festschrift in honor of W.W. Tait, Erich Reck ed. (College Publications, London, 2018).
- ”Carnap* Replies” Monist 101 (2018): 388-393.
- Hellman, Geoffrey (1993) Constructive Mathematics and Quantum Mechanics: Unbounded Operators and the Spectral Theorem, Journal of Philosophical Logic 12, 221-248.
- Feferman, Solomon; Hellman, Geoffrey (1995) Predicative foundations of arithmetic. J. Philos. Logic 24, no. 1, 1--17.
- Hellman, Geoffrey (1997) Bayes and beyond. Philos. Sci. 64, no. 2, 191–221.
- Hellman, Geoffrey (1998) Mathematical constructivism in spacetime. British J. Philos. Sci. 49, no. 3, 425–450.
- Feferman, Solomon; Hellman, Geoffrey (2000) "Challenges to predicative foundations of arithmetic" in G. Sher and R. Tieszen, eds.Between logic and Intuition, 317–338, Cambridge Univ. Press, Cambridge.
