= James Franklin (philosopher) =

Australian philosopher, mathematician and historian of ideas (born 1953)

James Franklin (born 1953) is an Australian philosopher, mathematician and historian of ideas.

== Life and career ==
Franklin was born in Sydney. He was educated at St. Joseph's College, Hunters Hill, New South Wales. His undergraduate work was at the University of Sydney (1971–74), where he attended St John's College and he was influenced by philosophers David Stove and David Armstrong. He completed his PhD in 1981 at the University of Warwick, on algebraic groups. He taught in the School of Mathematics and Statistics at the University of New South Wales from 1981 until his retirement in 2019.

His research areas include the philosophy of mathematics and the 'formal sciences', the history of probability, Australian Catholic history, the parallel between ethics and mathematics, restraint, the quantification of rights in applied ethics, and the analysis of extreme risk. Franklin is the literary executor of David Stove.

He is a Fellow of the Royal Society of New South Wales.

=== History of ideas ===
His 2001 book, The Science of Conjecture: Evidence and Probability Before Pascal, covered the development of thinking about uncertain evidence over many centuries up to 1650. Its central theme was ancient and medieval work on the law of evidence, which developed concepts like half-proof, similar to modern proof beyond reasonable doubt, as well as analyses of aleatory contracts like insurance and gambling. The book was praised by Nassim Taleb.

His polemical history of Australian philosophy, Corrupting the Youth (2003), praised the Australian realist tradition in philosophy and criticised postmodernist and relativist trends.

=== Philosophy of mathematics ===
In the philosophy of mathematics, Franklin defends an Aristotelian realist theory, according to which mathematics is about certain real features of the world, namely the quantitative and structural features (such as ratios and symmetry). The theory is developed in his 2014 book An Aristotelian Realist Philosophy of Mathematics: Mathematics as the Science of Quantity and Structure. The theory stands in opposition to both Platonism and nominalism, and emphasises applied mathematics and mathematical modelling as the most philosophically central parts of mathematics. He is the founder of the Sydney School in the philosophy of mathematics. Over the years, the School has hosted many emerging Australasian researchers and philosophers. Paul Thagard writes that "the current philosophy of mathematics that fits best with what is known about minds and science is James Franklin's Aristotelian realism."

In the philosophy of probability, he argues for an objective Bayesian view according to which the relation of evidence to conclusion is strictly a matter of logic. An example is evidence for and against conjectures in pure mathematics. His book What Science Knows: And How It Knows It develops the philosophy of science from an objective Bayesian viewpoint.

=== Ethics ===
His work on the parallel between ethics and mathematics received the 2005 Eureka Prize for Research in Ethics.

In 1998 he set up and taught for ten years a course on Professional Issues and Ethics in Mathematics at UNSW.

He conducted the "Restraint Project", a study of the virtue of temperance or self-control in Australia. In 2008 he set up the Australian Database of Indigenous Violence.

His book, The Worth of Persons: The Foundation of Ethics, appeared in 2022.

=== Philosophy of religion ===
Franklin has defended Pascal's Wager and Leibniz's Best of all possible worlds theory, and has discussed emergentism as an alternative to materialist atheism and pantheism.

=== Australian Catholic history ===
He is the editor of the Journal of the Australian Catholic Historical Society. His books on Australian Catholic history are Catholic Values and Australian Values (2006), The Real Archbishop Mannix (2015, with G.O.Nolan and M. Gilchrist), Catholic Thought and Catholic Action: Scenes from Australian Catholic Life (2023) and Arthur Calwell (with G.O Nolan). He has written also on the Catholic sexual abuse crisis, Magdalen laundries, missions to Aboriginal Australians, and the virtuous life of Catholic rural communities.

== Bibliography ==
- 1982, The Renaissance Myth, Quadrant 26 (11):51–60.
- 1994, The formal sciences discover the philosophers' stone, in: Studies in History and Philosophy of Science, Volume 25, No. 4, 513–533, Elsevier Science Ltd.
- 1996 and 2011, Proof in Mathematics: An Introduction ISBN 978-1-876192-00-6, originally published as Introduction to Proofs in Mathematics, in 1988.
- 2000,, in: The New Criterion, Volume 18, No. 10, June 2000.
- 2000, Diagrammatic reasoning and modelling in the imagination: the secret weapons of the Scientific Revolution, in: 1543 and All That: Image and Word, Change and Continuity in the Proto-Scientific Revolution, ed. G. Freeland & A. Corones, Dordrecht: Kluwer, 53–115.
- 2001, repr. 2015, The Science of Conjecture: Evidence and Probability Before Pascal, ISBN 978-0-8018-7109-2;
- 2003, Corrupting the Youth: A History of Philosophy in Australia, ISBN 978-1-876492-08-3;
- 2003, "The representation of context: ideas from artificial intelligence" in: Law, Probability and Risk 2, 191–199.
- Franklin, James & Sarah Chee Tueno (July–August 2003). "Graduate and childless". Quadrant. 47 (7–8 [398]): 52–55.
- 2006, Chapter on 'Artifice and the natural world: Mathematics, logic, technology', in: Cambridge History of Eighteenth Century Philosophy, ed. K. Haakonssen, Cambridge, 2006, 817–853.
- 2006, Catholic Values and Australian Realities , ISBN 978-0-9758015-4-3;
- 2007, Life to the Full: Rights and Social Justice in Australia , (edited) ISBN 978-1-921421-00-6
- 2009, What Science Knows: And How It Knows It ISBN 978-1-59403-207-3
- 2010, The postmodern calculus, New Criterion 29 (1) (Sept 2010), 75-80.
- 2014, An Aristotelian Realist Philosophy of Mathematics, ISBN 978-1-137-40072-7
- 2015, The Real Archbishop Mannix: From the Sources, ISBN 9781925138344
- 2022, The Worth of Persons: The Foundation of Ethics, ISBN 9781641772785
- 2022, Mathematics, a Core Part of Classical Education, Australian Classical Education Society, (2 July 2022).
- 2022, The Global/Local Distinction Vindicates Leibniz’s Theodicy, Theology and Science, Vol.20, No.4, (October 2022), pp.445-462. doi:10.1080/14746700.2022.2124481
- 2023, Catholic Thought and Catholic Action: Scenes from Australian Catholic Life, ISBN 9781922815354
- 2023, Arthur Calwell, ISBN 9781922815811
- 2025, The Necessities Underlying Reality: Connecting Philosophy of Mathematics, Ethics and Probability, ISBN 9781350467101

== See also ==
- Ethics in mathematics – Emerging field of applied ethics
- Continuity thesis – Hypothesis regarding European intellectual history
