= Iyyun =

- Discipline: Philosophy
- Language: English, Hebrew
- Edited by: Hagi Kenaan, Eva Shorr

Publication details
- History: 1945–present
- Publisher: S. H. Bergman Center for Philosophical Studies of the Hebrew University of Jerusalem (Israel)
- Frequency: Biannual

Standard abbreviations
- ISO 4: Iyyun

Indexing
- ISSN: 0021-3306
- LCCN: he65000235
- OCLC no.: 242373817

Links
- Journal homepage

Iyyun: The Jerusalem Journal of Philosophy ("Iyyun" literally means "inquiry" or "study") is published by the S. H. Bergman Center for Philosophical Studies of the Hebrew University of Jerusalem. It was established in 1945 as a Hebrew philosophical quarterly by Martin Buber, S. H. Bergman, and Julius Guttmann. As of volume 39 (1990), Iyyun appears four times a year: January and July in English, April and October in Hebrew. Each English issue carries abstracts of the articles in the previous Hebrew issue.

Volume 1, no. 1 was published in October 1945, and it included papers by Ernst Cassirer, Felix Weltsch, Fritz Heinemann, Nathan Rotenstreich, and others. A double issue (vol. 1, nos. 2-3) followed in November 1946, and the fourth one appeared in July 1949, that is, from the end of World War II and through the 1948 Arab–Israeli War. Ever since January 1951 (vol. 2, no. 1), Iyyun has appeared regularly.

The name Iyyun derives from the traditional Rabbinic-term for in depth study; see Yeshiva § Talmud study.

== Notable articles ==
The following is a list of some notable articles in Iyyun:

- "A Problem in the Empiricist Construal of Theories" (1972) - Carl G. Hempel (Hebrew with English summary)
- "The Uniqueness of the Natural Numbers" (1990) - Charles Parsons
- "A Lecture on Maimonides' Guide of the Perplexed" (1998) - Shlomo Pines (Hebrew)
- "Consciousness and the Mind" (2002) - David M. Rosenthal
- "Self-knowledge, Intentionality, and Normativity" (2005) - Akeel Bilgrami
- "On the Usefulness of final ends" - Harry Frankfurt
- "Dialogism and the Scientific Method" (2007) - Mara Beller
- "A Note on Steiner on Wittgenstein, Godel, and Tarski" (2008) - Hilary Putnam
