= Paul Benacerraf =

American philosopher (1930–2025)

- Born: Paul Joseph Salomon Benacerraf; 26 March 1930; Paris, France
- Died: 13 January 2025 (aged 94)

Education
- Education: Princeton University (PhD, 1960)
- Thesis: Logicism, Some Considerations (1960)
- Doctoral advisor: Hilary Putnam

Philosophical work
- Era: Contemporary philosophy
- Region: Western philosophy
- School: Analytic philosophy
- Institutions: Princeton University
- Doctoral students: Paul Boghossian; John Earman; Alvin Goldman; Richard Grandy; Philip Kitcher; Robert Nozick; Gideon Rosen; Ronald de Sousa; Stephen Stich
- Main interests: Philosophy of mathematics
- Notable ideas: Mathematical structuralism (eliminative variety); Benacerraf's identification problem for set-theoretic realism Benacerraf's epistemological problem for mathematical realism

Paul Joseph Salomon Benacerraf (/ˌbɛnəseɪˈrɑːf/; 26 March 1930 – 13 January 2025) was a French-born American philosopher working in the field of the philosophy of mathematics who taught at Princeton University his entire career, from 1960 until his retirement in 2007. Benacerraf was appointed Stuart Professor of Philosophy in 1974, and retired as the James S. McDonnell Distinguished University Professor of Philosophy.

== Life and career ==
Benacerraf was born in Paris on 26 March 1930, to a Moroccan-Venezuelan Sephardic Jewish father, Abraham Benacerraf, and Algerian Jewish mother, Henrietta Lasry. In 1939 the family moved to Caracas and then to New York City.

When the family returned to Caracas, Benacerraf remained in the United States, boarding at the Peddie School in Hightstown, New Jersey. He attended Princeton University for both his undergraduate and graduate studies.

He was elected a fellow of the American Academy of Arts and Sciences in 1998.

Benacerraf died on 13 January 2025, at the age of 94. His older brother was the Venezuelan Nobel Prize-winning immunologist Baruj Benacerraf.

== Philosophical work ==
Benacerraf was perhaps best known for his two papers "What Numbers Could Not Be" (1965) and "Mathematical Truth" (1973), and for his anthology on the philosophy of mathematics, co-edited with Hilary Putnam.

In "What Numbers Could Not Be" (1965), Benacerraf argues against a Platonist view of mathematics, and for structuralism, on the ground that what is important about numbers is the abstract structures they represent rather than the objects that number words ostensibly refer to. In particular, this argument is based on the point that Ernst Zermelo and John von Neumann give distinct, and completely adequate, identifications of natural numbers with sets (see Zermelo ordinals and von Neumann ordinals). This argument is called Benacerraf's identification problem.

In "Mathematical Truth" (1973), he argues that no interpretation of mathematics offers a satisfactory package of epistemology and semantics; it is possible to explain mathematical truth in a way that is consistent with our syntactico-semantical treatment of truth in non-mathematical language, and it is possible to explain our knowledge of mathematics in terms consistent with a causal account of epistemology, but it is in general not possible to accomplish both of these objectives simultaneously (this argument is called Benacerraf's epistemological problem). He argues for this on the grounds that an adequate account of truth in mathematics implies the existence of abstract mathematical objects, but that such objects are epistemologically inaccessible because they are causally inert and beyond the reach of sense perception. On the other hand, an adequate epistemology of mathematics, say one that ties truth-conditions to proof in some way, precludes understanding how and why the truth-conditions have any bearing on truth.

== Publications ==
- Benacerraf, Paul (1960) Logicism, Some Considerations, Princeton, Ph.D. Dissertation, University Microfilms.
- ———— (1965) "What Numbers Could Not Be", The Philosophical Review, 74:47–73.
- ———— (1967) "God, the Devil, and Gödel", The Monist, 51: 9–33.
- ———— (1973) "Mathematical Truth", The Journal of Philosophy, 70: 661–679.
- ———— (1981) "Frege: The Last Logicist", The Foundations of Analytic Philosophy, Midwest Studies in Philosophy, 6: 17–35.
- ———— (1985) "Skolem and the Skeptic", Proceedings of the Aristotelian Society, Supplementary Volume 56: 85–115.
- ———— and Putnam, Hilary (eds.) (1983) Philosophy of Mathematics : Selected Readings 2nd edition, Cambridge University Press: New York.
- ———— (1996) "Recantation or Any old ω-sequence would do after all", Philosophia Mathematica, 4: 184–189.
- ———— (1996) What Mathematical Truth Could Not Be – I, in Benacerraf and His Critics, A. Morton and S. P. Stich, eds., Blackwell's, Oxford and Cambridge, pp 9–59.
- ———— (1999) What Mathematical Truth Could Not Be – II, in Sets and Proofs, S. B. Cooper and J. K. Truss, eds., Cambridge University Press, pp. 27–51.

== See also ==
- American philosophy
- List of American philosophers
