= Argument–deduction–proof distinctions =

Argument–deduction–proof distinctions originated with logic itself. Naturally, the terminology evolved.

== Argument ==
An argument, more fully a premise–conclusion argument, is a two-part system composed of premises and conclusion. An argument is valid if and only if its conclusion is a consequence of its premises. Every premise set has infinitely many consequences each giving rise to a valid argument. Some consequences are obviously so, but most are not: most are hidden consequences. Most valid arguments are not yet known to be valid. To determine validity in non-obvious cases deductive reasoning is required. There is no deductive reasoning in an argument per se; such must come from the outside.

Every argument's conclusion is a premise of other arguments. The word constituent may be used for either a premise or conclusion. In the context of this article and in most classical contexts, all candidates for consideration as argument constituents fall under the category of truth-bearer: propositions, statements, sentences, judgments, etc.

== Deduction ==
A deduction is a three-part system composed of premises, a conclusion, and chain of intermediates – steps of reasoning showing that its conclusion is a consequence of its premises. The reasoning in a deduction is by definition cogent. Such reasoning itself, or the chain of intermediates representing it, has also been called an argument, more fully a deductive argument. In many cases, an argument can be known to be valid by means of a deduction of its conclusion from its premises but non-deductive methods such as Venn diagrams and other graphic procedures have been proposed.

== Proof ==
A proof is a deduction whose premises are known truths. A proof of the Pythagorean theorem is a deduction that might use several premises – axioms, postulates, and definitions – and contain dozens of intermediate steps. As Alfred Tarski famously emphasized in accord with Aristotle, truths can be known by proof but proofs presuppose truths not known by proof.

== Comparison ==
Premise-conclusion arguments do not require or produce either knowledge of validity or knowledge of truth. Premise sets may be chosen arbitrarily and conclusions may be chosen arbitrarily. Deductions require knowing how to reason but they do not require knowledge of truth of their premises. Deductions produce knowledge of the validity of arguments but ordinarily they do not produce knowledge of the truth of their conclusions. Proofs require knowledge of the truth of their premises, they require knowledge of deductive reasoning, and they produce knowledge of their conclusions.

== Context ==
Modern logicians disagree concerning the nature of argument constituents. Quine devotes the first chapter of Philosophy of Logic to this issue. Historians have not even been able to agree on what Aristotle took as constituents.

Argument–deduction–proof distinctions are inseparable from what have been called the consequence–deducibility distinction and the truth-and-consequence conception of proof. Variations among argument–deduction–proof distinctions are not all terminological.

Logician Alonzo Church never used the word argument in the above sense and had no synonym. Church never explained that deduction is the process of producing knowledge of consequence and it never used the common noun deduction for an application of the deduction process. His primary focus in discussing proof was "conviction" produced by generation of chains of logical truths – not the much more widely applicable and more familiar general process of demonstration as found in pre-Aristotelian geometry and discussed by Aristotle. He did discuss deductions in the above sense but not by that name: he called them awkwardly "proofs from premises" – an expression he coined for the purpose.

The absence of argument–deduction–proof distinctions is entirely consonant with Church's avowed Platonistic logicism. Following Dummett's insightful remarks about Frege, which – mutatis mutandis – apply even more to Church, it might be possible to explain the today-surprising absence.
