= Benacerraf's identification problem =

Argument in philosophy of mathematics

In the philosophy of mathematics, Benacerraf's identification problem is a philosophical argument developed by Paul Benacerraf against set-theoretic Platonism and published in 1965 in an article entitled "What Numbers Could Not Be". Historically, the work became a significant catalyst in motivating the development of mathematical structuralism.

The identification problem argues that there exists a fundamental problem in reducing natural numbers to pure sets. Since there exists an infinite number of ways of identifying the natural numbers with pure sets, no particular set-theoretic method can be determined as the "true" reduction. Benacerraf infers that any attempt to make such a choice of reduction immediately results in generating a meta-level, set-theoretic falsehood, namely in relation to other elementarily-equivalent set-theories not identical to the one chosen. The identification problem argues that this creates a fundamental problem for Platonism, which maintains that mathematical objects have a real, abstract existence. Benacerraf's dilemma to Platonic set-theory is arguing that the Platonic attempt to identify the "true" reduction of natural numbers to pure sets, as revealing the intrinsic properties of these abstract mathematical objects, is impossible. As a result, the identification problem ultimately argues that the relation of set theory to natural numbers cannot have an ontologically Platonic nature.

== Historical motivations ==
The historical motivation for the development of Benacerraf's identification problem derives from a fundamental problem of ontology. Since Medieval times, philosophers have argued as to whether the ontology of mathematics contains abstract objects. In the philosophy of mathematics, an abstract object is traditionally defined as an entity that: (1) exists independent of the mind; (2) exists independent of the empirical world; and (3) has eternal, unchangeable properties. Traditional mathematical Platonism maintains that some set of mathematical elements–natural numbers, real numbers, functions, relations, systems–are such abstract objects. Contrarily, mathematical nominalism denies the existence of any such abstract objects in the ontology of mathematics.

In the late 19th and early 20th century, a number of anti-Platonist programs gained in popularity. These included intuitionism, formalism, and predicativism. By the mid-20th century, however, these anti-Platonist theories had a number of their own issues. This subsequently resulted in a resurgence of interest in Platonism. It was in this historic context that the motivations for the identification problem developed.

== Description ==
The identification problem begins by evidencing some set of elementarily-equivalent, set-theoretic models of the natural numbers. Benacerraf considers two such set-theoretic methods:

Set-theoretic method I (using Zermelo ordinals)

$$\begin{align}
& 0 = \varnothing \\
& 1 = \{\,0\,\} = \{\,\varnothing\,\} \\
& 2 = \{\,1\,\} = \{\,\{\,\varnothing\,\}\,\} \\
& 3 = \{\,2\,\} = \{\,\{\,\{\,\varnothing\,\}\,\}\,\} \\
& \,\,\,\,\,\,\vdots
\end{align}$$

Set-theoretic method II (using von Neumann ordinals)

$$\begin{align}
& 0 = \varnothing \\
& 1 = \{\,0\,\} = \{\,\varnothing\,\} \\
& 2 = \{\,0,1\,\} = \{\,\varnothing, \{\,\varnothing\,\}\,\} \\
& 3 = \{\,0,1,2\,\} = \{\, \varnothing, \{\, \varnothing \,\}, \{\, \varnothing, \{\, \varnothing \,\} \,\}  \,\} \\
& \,\,\,\,\,\,\vdots
\end{align}$$

As Benacerraf demonstrates, both method I and II reduce natural numbers to sets. Benacerraf formulates the dilemma as a question: which of these set-theoretic methods uniquely provides the true identity statements, which elucidates the true ontological nature of the natural numbers? Either method I or II could be used to define the natural numbers and subsequently generate true arithmetical statements to form a mathematical system. In their relation, the elements of such mathematical systems are isomorphic in their structure. However, the problem arises when these isomorphic structures are related together on the meta-level. The definitions and arithmetical statements from system I are not identical to the definitions and arithmetical statements from system II. For example, the two systems differ in their answer to whether 0 ∈ 2, insofar as ∅ is not an element of {{∅}}. Thus, in terms of failing the transitivity of identity, the search for true identity statements similarly fails. By attempting to reduce the natural numbers to sets, this renders a set-theoretic falsehood between the isomorphic structures of different mathematical systems. This is the essence of the identification problem.

He also demonstrates this with a story which Penelope Maddy describes in Realism in Mathematics:

"Ernie and Johnny are both brought up on set theory. When the time comes to learn arithmetic, Ernie is told, to his delight, that he already knows about the numbers; they are 0 (called 'zero'), {0} (called 'one'), {0, {0}} (called 'two'), and so on. His teachers define the operations of addition and multiplication on these sets, and when all the relabelling is done, Ernie counts and does arithmetic just like his schoolmates. Johnny's story is exactly the same, except that he is told that the Zermelo ordinals are the numbers. He also counts and does arithmetic in agreement with his schoolmates, and with Ernie. The boys enjoy doing sums together, learning about primes, searching for perfect numbers, and so on. But Ernie and Johnny are curious little boys; they want to know everything they can about these wonderful things, the numbers. In the process, Ernie discovers the surprising fact that one is a member of three. In fact, he generalizes, if n is bigger than m, then m is a member of n. Filled with enthusiasm, he brings this fact to the attention of his favourite playmate. But here, sadly, the budding mathematical collaboration breaks down. Johnny not only fails to share Ernie's enthusiasm, he declares the prized theorem to be outright false! He won't even admit that three has three members!"

According to Benacerraf, the philosophical ramifications of this identification problem result in Platonic approaches failing the ontological test. The argument is used to demonstrate the impossibility for Platonism to reduce numbers to sets and reveal the existence of abstract objects.

== See also ==
- Benacerraf's epistemological problem

== Bibliography ==
- Benacerraf, Paul (1973) "Mathematical Truth", in Benacerraf & Putnam Philosophy of Mathematics: Selected Readings, Cambridge: Cambridge University Press, 2nd edition. 1983, pp. 403–420.
- Hale, Bob (1987) Abstract Objects. Oxford: Basil Blackwell. ISBN 0631145931
