= Aristotle's theory of universals =

Philosophical theory

Plato's forms exist as universals, like the ideal form of an apple. For Aristotle, both matter and form belong to the individual thing (hylomorphism).

Aristotle's theory of universals is Aristotle's classical solution to the problem of universals, sometimes known as the hylomorphic theory of immanent realism. Universals are the characteristics or qualities that ordinary objects or things have in common. They can be identified in the types, properties, or relations observed in the world. For example, imagine there is a bowl of red apples resting on a table. Each apple in that bowl will have many similar qualities, such as their red coloring or "redness". They will share some degree of the quality of "ripeness" depending on their age. They may also be at varying degrees of age, which will affect their color, but they will all share a universal "appleness". These qualities are the universals that the apples hold in common.

The problem of universals asks three questions. Do universals exist? If they exist, where do they exist? Also, if they exist, how do we obtain knowledge of them? In Aristotle's view, universals are incorporeal and universal, but only exist only where they are instantiated; they exist only in things. Aristotle said that a universal is identical in each of its instances. All red things are similar in that there is the same universal, redness, in each thing. There is no Platonic Form of redness, standing apart from all red things; instead, each red thing has a copy of the same property, redness. For the Aristotelian, knowledge of the universals is not obtained from a supernatural source. It is obtained from experience by means of active intellect.

== Overview ==
In Aristotle's view, universals can be instantiated multiple times. He states that one and the same universal, such as applehood, appears in every real apple. A common sense challenge would be to inquire what remains exactly the same in all these different things, since the theory is claiming that something remains the same. Stating that different beautiful things, such as the Pacific Ocean, The Eiffel Tower, or the nighttime sky is beautiful is just to say that each thing is the same (qualitatively) in terms of beauty. Aristotle is talking about a category of being here that is not a thing but a quality. A common defense of Aristotle's realism is therefore that we should not expect universals to behave like ordinary physical objects. To say the same universal, beautiful, occurs simultaneously in all these things is no more strange than saying that each thing is beautiful.

A second issue is whether Aristotelian universals are abstract: if they are, then the theory must deal with how to abstract the concept of redness from one or more red things. Aristotle argued that people form concepts and make generalizations in the manner of a young child, who is just on the verge of grasping a generic concept such as human being. In his view, the child is gathering his or her memories of various encounters with individual humans, searching for the essential similarity that stands out, on reflection, in every instance. Today, it might be said that one mentally extracts from each thing the quality that they all have in common. When the child grasps the concept of a human being, he or she has learnt to ignore the accidental details of each person's past experiences and individual differences, and has paid attention to the relevant quality that they all have in common, namely, humanity. In Aristotle's view, the universal humanity is a natural kind defined by the essential properties that all humans have in common.

== See also ==
- Hylomorphism
- Aristotelian realist philosophy of mathematics
- Metaphysics (Aristotle)
