= Objectivism (disambiguation) =

Objectivism is a philosophical system created by Ayn Rand that declares real knowledge to be metaphysically objective.

Objectivism, or Objectivist, may also refer to:

- Objectivism (poetry), a group of Modernist writers who emerged in the 1930s
- Objectivist movement, a movement formed by followers and students of Rand's philosophy
- Objectivism: The Philosophy of Ayn Rand, a 1991 book by Leonard Peikoff
- Objectivist Party, an American political party espousing Rand's philosophy
- Anti-psychologism, or logical objectivism, the conviction that the rules of logic are mind-independent
- Moral objectivism or moral realism, the meta-ethical position that ethical sentences express factual propositions about robust or mind-independent features of the world, and that some such propositions are true

== See also ==
- Object (disambiguation)
- Objective (disambiguation)
- Objectivity (disambiguation)
- Subjectivism (disambiguation)
