= Ralph Strode =

English schoolman and putative poet

Ralph Strode (fl. 1350 – 1400), English schoolman, and putative poet, was probably a native of the West Midlands.

He was a fellow of Merton College, Oxford, before 1360, and famous as a teacher of logic and philosophy and a writer on educational subjects. He belonged, like Thomas Aquinas and Bonaventure, to that "School of the Middle" which mediated between realists and nominalists.

Besides his Logica, he wrote Consequentiae, a treatise on the syllogism, and Obligationes or Scholastica militia, a series of "formal exercises in scholastic dialectics." He had some not unfriendly controversy with his colleague John Wyclif, against whom he defended the possession of wealth by the clergy, and held that in the Church abuses were better than disturbance. He also attacked Wyclif's doctrine of predestination. His positions are gathered from Wyclif's Responsiones ad Rodolphum Strodum (MS. 3926, Vienna Imperial Library).

Chaucer dedicates his poem Troilus and Criseyde to the contemporary poet John Gower and to Strode:

"O moral Gower, this book I directe
To the, and to the, philosophical Strode,
To vouchen sauf, ther nede is, to correcte,
Of youre benignités and zeles goode.

— (Book V, 1856-1860)

Modern English translation: "O moral Gower, I permit this book to you, and to you, philosophical Strode, to correct, away from your benevolence and zealous goodness." It is quite possible that Troilus and Criseyde was dedicated to "philosophical" (in one of the manuscripts: "logical") Strode because the philosopher introduced Chaucer to some of the basic philosophical distinctions between late medieval nominalism and realism. Thus, Chaucer's literary nominalism in his longest complete poem may well be due to his acquaintance with Strode.

According to the 15th-century Vetus catalogus of fellows of Merton, Strode himself was a "poeta nobilis." John Leland and John Bale confirm this, but none of Strode's poems have survived. However, Professor Israel Gollancz suggested that the Phantasma Radulphi attributed to Strode in the Vetus Catalogus could be the 14th-century elegiac poem The Pearl, but this has found little support from later scholars and, on the basis of the poem's dialect, seems very unlikely.

From 1375 to 1385 this Strode or another of the same name was Common Serjeant of London; he died in 1387.

== Works ==
- Logica, (unedited apart from Consequentie and Obligationes; the manuscript can be found in Bodl. MS canon. misc. 219, fols 13r-52v).
- Consequentie Strodi cum commento Alexandri Sermonete, Declarationes Gaetani in easdem consequentias, Dubia magistri Pauli Pergulensis, Obligationes eiusdem Strodi, Venice 1493.
- Wallace Knight Seaton, An Edition and Translation of the "Tractatus de consequentiis" by Ralph Strode, fourteenth century logician and friend of Geoffrey Chaucer, (unpublished Doctoral dissertation, University of California, Berkeley, 1973).
