= Scotistic realism =

Position on the problem of universals

Scotistic realism (also Scotist realism or Scotist formalism) is the Scotist position on the problem of universals. It is a form of moderate realism, which is sometimes referred to as 'scholastic realism'. The position maintains that universals exist both in particular objects and as concepts in the mind.

The "problem of universals" was an ancient problem in metaphysics about whether universals exist. For John Duns Scotus, a Franciscan philosopher, theologian and Catholic priest, universals such as "greenness" and "goodness" exist in reality. This is opposed to the later nominalism of William of Ockham, and the earlier conceptualism of Abelard, which say universals exist only within the mind and have no external or substantial reality, or universals don't exist at all (including the mind). In addition, Scotus doesn't think that universals exist in some "third realm" or "Platonic heaven", as Plato thought (i.e. Platonism).

In this way, Scotistic realism can be seen as a middle ground between Aristotelian realism (i.e. immanent realism) and conceptualism. Scotistic realism can also be seen to take a nod to Platonism. Not because Scotus thinks that universals ultimately trace back to a "Platonic Heaven"; rather, because (for Scotus) universals ultimately trace back to ideas in God's mind.

Therefore, scotistic realism affirms that universals exist in particular objects, finite minds, and the infinite mind of God.

== In scholasticism ==
The problem of universals existed as early as Plato, who taught the Theory of Forms, that universal "forms" existed. This opinion was rejected by many later thinkers, such as Peter Abelard, who instead argued that forms are merely mental constructs.

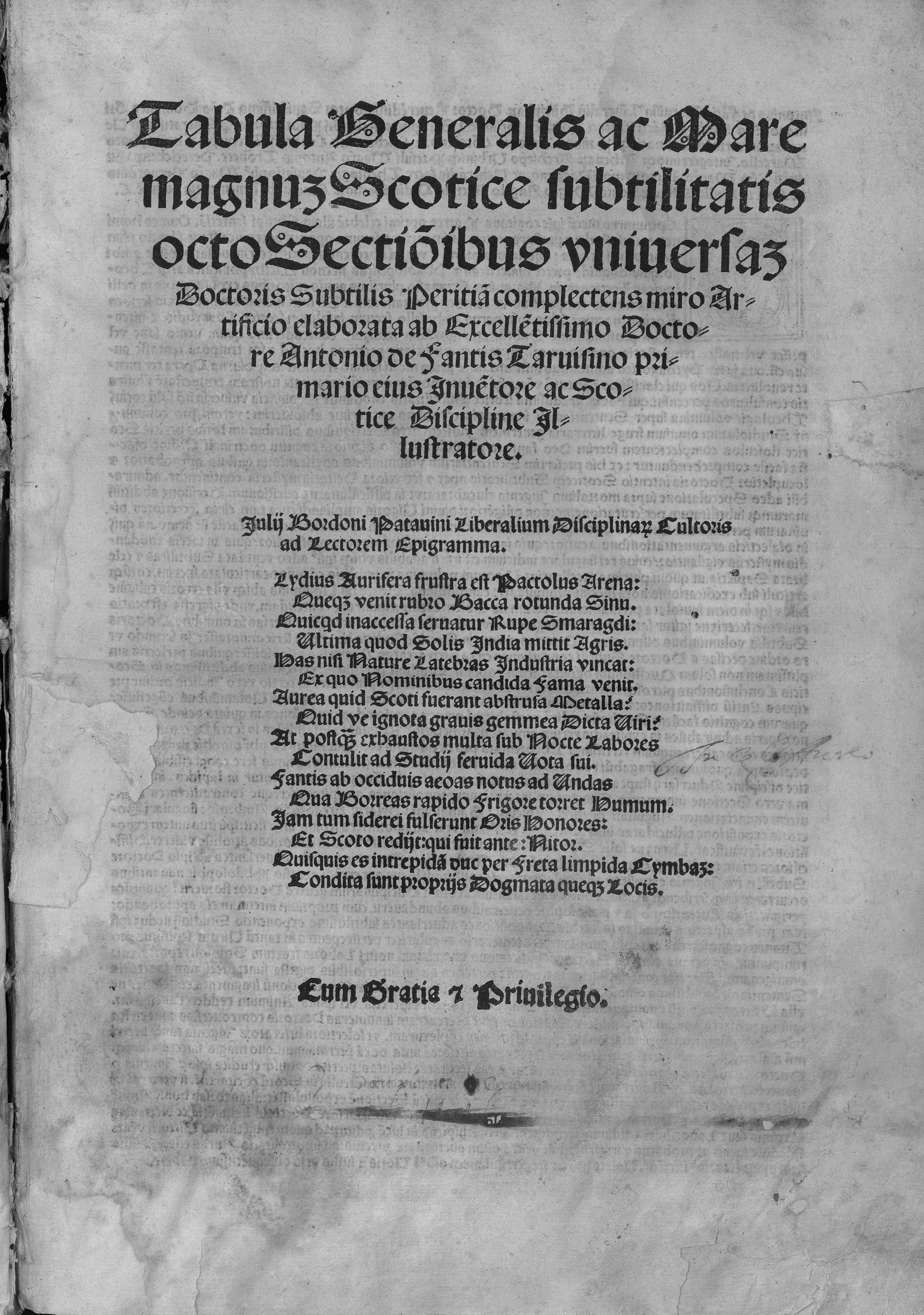
Antonio De Fantis, Tabula generalis ac Mare magnum Scotice subtilitatis

Scotus denied these claims; in his Opus Oxoniense he argued that universals have a real and substantial existence. For Scotus, the problem of universals was closely tied to that of individuation, by identifying what makes a particular thing this or that particular thing; we could also come to understand if any form of universal exists, it is in this work that Scotus introduces the word "haecceity", which means the "thisness" of a particular object – what makes it what it is.

I say then that the main reason for the likening or similarity is the form itself shared between the generator and the generated, not according to individual unity and identity insofar as it is "this" form, but according to a lesser unity and identity insofar as it is a form. The reason for generating is in accordance with this. Form also is a more principal reason for the distinction than matter is, because just as the form is more principally that by which something is a composite than the matter is, so it is more principally that by which a composite is one, and consequently not distinguished in itself and yet distinct from everything else

— Scotus, Ordinatio II, d. 3, p. 1. q. 6, n. 210 [Scotus, (1950-), 7:412-413; Spade (1994), 69]

In this, Scotus argues that form is a better means of individuating a particular object; because according to him the form of an object as a composite is the best manner of making objects distinct from one another, rather than the matter of the object. This is at the heart of Scotist realism, particularly at the theories of haecceity and formal distinction. Scotus also argues, against Aquinas and others, that there is no distinction between the essence of a thing and its existence.

== Interpretation of C. S. Peirce ==
The American philosopher Charles Sanders Peirce was quite influenced by Scotus. Here is a statement of Peirce's interpretation of Scotistic Realism by T. A. Goudge:

The gist of that 'subtle and difficult' doctrine is taken by Peirce to be as follows. Apart from thought, only singular things exist. But there are in singulars certain 'natures,' themselves neither universal nor particular, which constitute the ground of intelligibility. In things, these natures are particular; when brought into relation with an act of the intellect, they are universal ... Thus, for example, the directly experienced hard surface of a particular stone is determinate, whereas the universal hardness which the intellect grasps is indeterminate or general. A consequence of this view is that the individual per se is not a proper object of knowledge. What we know are genera and species, themselves the product of mental action. Yet because complete being embraces both universality and particularity, because man perceives the singular with his senses while cognizing the universal with his intellect, it is possible for him to attain to the singular by relating universals to something which is this.

Peirce interprets Scotus's idea of individuation or haecceity (thisness) in terms of his own category of "secondness." When we think of this, we are relating our pointing finger, for example, or a particular sense organ with another individual thing. As Scotus said, "nothing is this in itself." It is so only in relation to something else. Goudge goes on to give Peirce's argument for the objectivity of universals:

The objection may be raised that such a view destroys the reality of the universal by making it depend on a relation to thought. Peirce replies that this objection springs from the belief that the real must be wholly independent of reflective activity, i.e., must be a thing in itself. But the notion of the thing in itself is self-contradictory, for it requires us to think about what is per definitionem out of relation to thought. We can have no conception of any incognizable reality ... Indeed, “a realist is simply one who knows no more recondite reality than that which is represented in a true representation.”
