= Similarity (philosophy) =

Relation of resemblance between objects

In philosophy, similarity or resemblance is a relation between objects that constitutes how much these objects are alike. Similarity comes in degrees: e.g. oranges are more similar to apples than to the moon. It is traditionally seen as an internal relation and analyzed in terms of shared properties: two things are similar because they have a property in common. The more properties they share, the more similar they are. They resemble each other exactly if they share all their properties. So an orange is similar to the moon because they both share the property of being round, but it is even more similar to an apple because additionally, they both share various other properties, like the property of being a fruit. On a formal level, similarity is usually considered to be a relation that is reflexive (everything resembles itself), symmetric (if a is similar to b then b is similar to a) and non-transitive (a need not resemble c despite a resembling b and b resembling c). Similarity comes in two forms: respective similarity, which is relative to one respect or feature, and overall similarity, which expresses the degree of resemblance between two objects all things considered. There is no general consensus whether similarity is an objective, mind-independent feature of reality, and, if so, whether it is a fundamental feature or reducible to other features. Resemblance is central to human cognition since it provides the basis for the categorization of entities into kinds and for various other cognitive processes like analogical reasoning. Similarity has played a central role in various philosophical theories, e.g. as a solution to the problem of universals through resemblance nominalism or in the analysis of counterfactuals in terms of similarity between possible worlds.

== Conceptions of similarity ==
Conceptions of similarity give an account of similarity and its degrees on a metaphysical level. The simplest view, though not very popular, sees resemblance as a fundamental aspect of reality that cannot be reduced to other aspects. The more common view is that the similarity between two things is determined by other facts, for example, by the properties they share, by their qualitative distance or by the existence of certain transformations between them. These conceptions analyze resemblance in terms of other aspects instead of treating it as a fundamental relation.

=== Numerical ===
The numerical conception holds that the degree of similarity between objects is determined by the number of properties they have in common. On the most basic version of this view, the degree of similarity is identical to this number. For example, "[i]f the properties of peas in a pod were just greenness, roundness and yuckiness ... then their degree of similarity would be three". Two things need to share at least one property to be considered similar. They resemble each other exactly if they have all their properties in common. This is also known as qualitative identity or indiscernibility. For the numerical conception of similarity to work, it is important that only properties relevant to resemblance are taken into account, sometimes referred to as sparse properties in contrast to abundant properties. Quantitative properties, like temperature or mass, which occur in degrees, pose another problem for the numerical conception. The reason for this is that e.g. a body with 40 °C resembles another body with 41 °C even though the two bodies do not have their temperature in common.

=== Metric ===
The problem of quantitative properties is better handled by the metric conception of similarity, which posits that there are certain dimensions of similarity concerning different respects, e.g. color, shape or weight, which constitute the axes of one unified metric space. This can be visualized in analogy to three-dimensional physical space, the axes of which are usually labeled with x, y and z. In both the qualitative and the physical metric space, the total distance is determined by the relative distances within each axis. The metric space thus constitutes a manner of aggregating various respective degrees of similarity into one overall degree of similarity. The corresponding function is sometimes referred to as a similarity measure. One problem with this outlook is that it is questionable whether the different respects are commensurable with each other in the sense that an increase in one type can make up for a lack in another type. Even if this should be allowed, there is still the question of how to determine the factor of correlation between degrees of different respects. Any such factor would seem to be artificial, as can be seen, for example, when considering possible responses to the following case: "[l]et one person resemble you more closely, overall, than someone else does. And let him become a bit less like you in respect of his weight by gaining a little. Now answer these questions: How much warmer or cooler should he become to restore the original overall comparison? How much more similar in respect of his height?" This problem does not arise for physical distance, which involves commensurable dimensions and which can be kept constant, for example, by moving the right amount north or south, after having moved a certain distance to the west. Another objection to the metric conception of similarity comes from empirical research suggesting that similarity judgments do not obey the axioms of metric space. For example, people are more likely to accept that "North Korea is similar to China" than that "China is similar to North Korea", thereby denying the axiom of symmetry.

=== Transformation ===
Another way to define similarity, best known from geometry, is in terms of transformations. According to this definition, two objects are similar if there exists a certain type of transformation that translates one object into the other object while leaving certain properties essential for similarity intact. For example, in geometry, two triangles are similar if there is a transformation, involving nothing but scaling, rotating, displacement and reflection, which maps one triangle onto the other. The property kept intact by these transformations concerns the angles of the two triangles.

== Respective and overall similarity ==
Judgments of similarity come in two forms: referring to respective similarity, which is relative to one respect or feature, or to overall similarity, which expresses the degree of resemblance between two objects all things considered. For example, a basketball resembles the sun with respect to its round shape but they are not very similar overall. It is usually assumed that overall similarity depends on respective similarity, e.g. that an orange is overall similar to an apple because they are similar in respect to size, shape, color, etc. This means that two objects cannot differ in overall similarity without differing in respective similarity. But there is no general agreement whether overall similarity can be fully analyzed by aggregating similarity in all respects. If this was true then it should be possible to keep the degree of similarity between the apple and the orange constant despite a change to the size of the apple by making up for it through a change in color, for example. But that this is possible, i.e. that increasing the similarity in another respect can make up for the lack of similarity in one respect, has been denied by some philosophers.

One special form of respective resemblance is perfect respective resemblance, which is given when two objects share exactly the same property, like being an electron or being made entirely of iron. A weaker version of respective resemblance is possible for quantitative properties, like mass or temperature, which involve a degree. Close degrees resemble each other without constituting shared properties. In this way, a pack of rice weighing 1000 grams resembles a honey melon weighing 1010 grams in respect to mass but not in virtue of sharing property. This type of respective resemblance and its impact on overall similarity gets further complicated for multi-dimensional quantities, like colors or shapes.

== Exact similarity and identity ==
Identity is the relation each thing bears only to itself. Both identity and exact similarity or indiscernibility are expressed by the word "same". For example, consider two children with the same bicycles engaged in a race while their mother is watching. The two children have the same bicycle in one sense (exact similarity) and the same mother in another sense (identity). The two senses of sameness are linked by two principles: the principle of indiscernibility of identicals and the principle of identity of indiscernibles. The principle of indiscernibility of identicals is uncontroversial and states that if two entities are identical with each other then they exactly resemble each other. The principle of identity of indiscernibles, on the other hand, is more controversial in making the converse claim that if two entities exactly resemble each other then they must be identical. This entails that "no two distinct things exactly resemble each other". A well-known counterexample comes from Max Black, who describes a symmetrical universe consisting of only two spheres with the same features. Black argues that the two spheres are indiscernible but not identical, thereby constituting a violation of the principle of identity of indiscernibles.

== Applications in philosophy ==
=== Problem of universals ===
The problem of universals is the problem to explain how different objects can have a feature in common and thereby resemble each other in this respect, for example, how water and oil can share the feature of being liquid. The realist solution posits an underlying universal that is instantiated by both objects and thus grounds their similarity. This is rejected by nominalists, who deny the existence of universals. Of special interest to the concept of similarity is the position known as resemblance nominalism, which treats resemblance between objects as a fundamental fact. So on this view, two objects have a feature in common because they resemble each other, not the other way round, as is commonly held. This way, the problem of universals is solved without the need of positing shared universals. One objection to this solution is that it fails to distinguish between coextensive properties. Coextensive properties are different properties that always come together, like having a heart and having a kidney. But in resemblance nominalism, they are treated as one property since all their bearers belong to the same resemblance class. Another counter-argument is that this approach does not fully solve the problem of universals since it seemingly introduces a new universal: resemblance itself.

=== Counterfactuals ===
Counterfactuals are sentences that express what would have been true under different circumstances, for example, "[i]f Richard Nixon had pushed the button, there would have been a nuclear war". Theories of counterfactuals try to determine the conditions under which counterfactuals are true or false. The most well-known approach, due to Robert Stalnaker and David Lewis, proposes to analyze counterfactuals in terms of similarity between possible worlds. A possible world is a way things could have been. According to the Stalnaker-Lewis-account, the antecedent or the if-clause picks out one possible world, in the example above, the world in which Nixon pushed the button. The counterfactual is true if the consequent or the then-clause is true in the selected possible world. The problem with the account sketched so far is that there are various possible worlds that could be picked out by the antecedent. Lewis proposes that the problem is solved through overall similarity: only the possible world most similar to the actual world is selected. A "system of weights" in the form of a set of criteria is to guide us in assessing the degree of similarity between possible worlds. For example, avoiding widespread violations of the laws of nature ("big miracles") is considered an important factor for similarity while proximity in particular facts has little impact. One objection to Lewis' approach is that the proposed system of weights captures not so much our intuition concerning similarity between worlds but instead aims to be consonant with our counterfactual intuitions. But considered purely in terms of similarity, the most similar world in the example above is arguably the world in which Nixon pushes the button, nothing happens and history continues just like it actually did.

=== Depiction ===
Depiction is the relation that pictures bear to the things they represent, for example, the relation between a photograph of Albert Einstein and Einstein himself. Theories of depiction aim to explain how pictures are able to refer. The traditional account, originally suggested by Plato, explains depiction in terms of mimesis or similarity. So the photograph depicts Einstein because it resembles him in respect to shape and color. In this regard, pictures are different from linguistic signs, which are arbitrarily related to their referents for most part. Pictures can indirectly represent abstract concepts, like God or love, by resembling concrete things, like a bearded man or a heart, which we associate with the abstract concept in question. Despite their intuitive appeal, resemblance-accounts of depiction face various problems. One problem comes from the fact that similarity is a symmetric relation, so if a is similar to b then b has to be similar to a. But Einstein does not depict his photograph despite being similar to it. Another problem comes from the fact that non-existing things, like dragons, can be depicted. So a picture of a dragon shows a dragon even though there are no dragons that could be similar to the picture. Defenders of resemblance-theories try to avoid these counter-examples by moving to more sophisticated formulations involving other concepts beside resemblance.

=== Argument from analogy ===
An analogy is a comparison between two objects based on similarity. Arguments from analogy involve inferences from information about a known object (the source) to the features of an unknown object (the target) based on similarity between the two objects. Arguments from analogy have the following form: a is similar to b and a has feature F, therefore b probably also has feature F. Using this scheme, it is possible to infer from the similarity between rats (a) and humans (b) and from the fact that birth control pills affect the brain development (F) of rats that they may also affect the brain development of humans. Arguments from analogy are defeasible: they make their conclusion rationally compelling but do not ensure its truth. The strength of such arguments depends, among other things, on the degree of similarity between the source and the target and on the relevance of this similarity to the inferred feature. Important arguments from analogy within philosophy include the argument from design (the universe resembles a machine and machines have intelligent designers, therefore the universe has an intelligent designer) and the argument from analogy concerning the existence of other minds (my body is similar to other human bodies and I have a mind, therefore they also have minds).

=== Family resemblance ===
The term family resemblance refers to Ludwig Wittgenstein's idea that certain concepts cannot be defined in terms of necessary and sufficient conditions which refer to essential features shared by all examples. Instead, the use of one concept for all its cases is justified by resemblance relations based on their shared features. These relations form "a network of overlapping but discontinuous similarities, like the fibres in a rope". One of Wittgenstein's favorite examples is the concept of games, which includes card games, board games, ball games, etc. Different games share various features with each other, like being amusing, involving winning and losing, depending on skill or luck, etc. According to Wittgenstein, to be a game is to be sufficiently similar to other games even though there are no properties essential to every game. These considerations threaten to render traditional attempts of discovering analytic definitions futile, such as for concepts like proposition, name, number, proof or language. Prototype theory is formulated based on these insights. It holds that whether an entity belongs to a conceptual category is determined by how close or similar this entity is to the prototype or exemplar of this concept.

== See also ==
- Analogy – Cognitive process of transferring information or meaning from a particular subject to another
- Counterfactuals – Conditionals that discuss what would have been if things were otherwise
- Depiction – Reference conveyed through pictures
- Family resemblance – Philosophical idea popularized by Ludwig Wittgenstein
- Identity (philosophy) – Relation each thing bears to itself alone
- Metric space – Mathematical space with a notion of distance
- Mimesis – Communication by means of imitation
- Resemblance Nominalism – Philosophy emphasizing names and labels
- Quiddity – Essence or inherent nature of thing
- Similarity (geometry) – Property of objects which are scaled or mirrored versions of each other
- Similarity (psychology) – Psychological proximity of two mental representations
- Similarity measure – Real-valued function that quantifies similarity between two objects
- Type–token distinction – Distinguishing objects and classes of objects
