= Raimbert of Lille =

Raimbert of Lille (fl. c. 1100) was an early medieval nominalist who taught at Lille. Along with Roscelin, he was an opponent of exaggerated realism. His nominalism was attacked by Odo of Tournai.
