= Eternal statement =

An eternal statement is a statement whose token instances all have the same truth value. For instance, every inscription or utterance of the sentence "On July 15, 2009 it rains in Boston" has the same truth value, no matter when or where it is asserted. This type of statement is distinguished from others in that its context will not influence its truth value. Essentially, an eternal statement is a true statement, regardless of how it used.
