= Veshch'/Gegenstand/Objet =

- Editor: El Lissitzky; Ilya Ehrenburg
- Categories: Constructivism (art)
- Frequency: twice
- Publisher: Skythen Verlag
- First issue: March 1922; 104 years ago
- Final issue Number: May 1922; 104 years ago 3
- Country: Germany
- Based in: Berlin
- Language: Russian/German/French

Veshch'/Gegenstand/Objet was an International Review of Modern Art published in Berlin by El Lissitzky and Ilya Ehrenburg in 1922. It was a trilingual publication whose title contained words for "object" in Russian (вещь), German (Gegenstand) and French (Objet). Following the publication of the initial issue Veshch 1–2 in March/April 1922, Veshch 3 was published in May 1922. There were no further issues.

Lissitzky had been working association with UNOVIS an art group formed by Malevich in Vitebsk. In December 1921 Lissitzky moved to Berlin. here he became an influential advocate of recent developments inRussian art, particularly constructivism.
