= Philosophical realism =

Philosophical concept

Philosophical realism—usually not treated as a position of its own but as a stance towards other subject matters—is the view that a certain kind of thing (ranging widely from abstract objects like numbers to moral statements to the physical world itself) has mind-independent existence, i.e. that it exists even in the absence of any mind perceiving it or that its existence is not just a mere appearance in the eye of the beholder. This includes a number of positions within epistemology and metaphysics which express that a given thing instead exists independently of knowledge, thought, or understanding. This can apply to items such as the physical world, the past and future, other minds, and the self, though may also apply less directly to things such as universals, mathematical truths, moral truths, and thought itself. However, realism may also include various positions which instead reject metaphysical treatments of reality altogether.

Realism can also be a view about the properties of reality in general, holding that reality exists independent of the mind, as opposed to non-realist views (like some forms of skepticism and solipsism) which question the certainty of anything beyond one's own mind. Philosophers who profess realism often claim that truth consists in a correspondence between cognitive representations and reality.

Realists tend to believe that whatever we believe now is only an approximation of reality but that the accuracy and fullness of understanding can be improved. In some contexts, realism is contrasted with idealism. Today it is more often contrasted with anti-realism, for example in the philosophy of science.

The oldest use of the term "realism" appeared in medieval scholastic interpretations and adaptations of ancient Greek philosophy. The position was also held among many ancient Indian philosophies.

== Etymology ==
The term comes from Late Latin realis "real" and was first used in the abstract metaphysical sense by Immanuel Kant in 1781 (CPR A 369).

== Varieties ==
=== Metaphysical realism ===
Metaphysical realism maintains that "whatever exists does so, and has the properties and relations it does, independently of deriving its existence or nature from being thought of or experienced." In other words, an objective reality exists (not merely one or more subjective realities).

=== Naive or direct realism ===
Naive realism, also known as direct realism, is a philosophy of mind rooted in a common sense theory of perception that claims that the senses provide us with direct awareness of the external world.

Direct Realism

Perceptual realism is the common sense view that tables, chairs and cups of coffee exist independently of perceivers. Direct realists also claim that it is with such objects that we directly engage. The objects of perception include such familiar items as paper clips, suns and olive oil tins. It is these things themselves that we see, smell, touch, taste and listen to. There are, however, two versions of direct realism: naïve direct realism and scientific direct realism. They differ in the properties they claim the objects of perception possess when they are not being perceived. Naïve realism claims that such objects continue to have all the properties that we usually perceive them to have, properties such as yellowness, warmth, and mass. Scientific realism, however, claims that some of the properties an object is perceived as having are dependent on the perceiver, and that unperceived objects should not be conceived as retaining them. Such a stance has a long history:

By convention sweet and by convention bitter, by convention hot, by convention cold, by convention colour; in reality atoms and void. [Democritus, c. 460-370 BCE, quoted by Sextus Empiricus in Barnes, 1987, pp. 252-253.]

In contrast, some forms of idealism assert that no world exists apart from mind-dependent ideas and some forms of skepticism say we cannot trust our senses. The naive realist view is that objects have properties, such as texture, smell, taste and colour, that are usually perceived absolutely correctly. We perceive them as they really are.

=== Immanent realism ===
Immanent realism is the ontological understanding which holds that universals are immanently real within particulars themselves, not in a separate realm, and not mere names. Most often associated with Aristotle and the Aristotelian tradition.

=== Scientific realism ===
Scientific realism is, at the most general level, the view that the world described by science is the real world, as it is, independent of what we might take it to be. Within philosophy of science, it is often framed as an answer to the question "how is the success of science to be explained?" The debate over what the success of science involves centers primarily on the status of unobservable entities apparently talked about by scientific theories. Generally, those who are scientific realists assert that one can make reliable claims about unobservables (viz., that they have the same ontological status) as observables. Analytic philosophers generally have a commitment to scientific realism, in the sense of regarding the scientific method as a reliable guide to the nature of reality. The main alternative to scientific realism is instrumentalism.

==== Scientific realism in physics ====
Realism in physics (especially quantum mechanics) is the claim that the world is in some sense mind-independent: that even if the results of a possible measurement do not pre-exist the act of measurement, that does not require that they are the creation of the observer (contrary to the "consciousness causes collapse" interpretation of quantum mechanics). That interpretation of quantum mechanics, on the other hand, states that the wave function is already the full description of reality. The different possible realities described by the wave function are equally true. The observer collapses the wave function into their own reality. One's reality can be mind-dependent under this interpretation of quantum mechanics.

=== Moral realism ===
Moral realism is the position that ethical sentences express propositions that refer to objective features of the world.

=== Aesthetic realism ===
Aesthetic realism (not to be confused with Aesthetic Realism, the philosophy developed by Eli Siegel, or "realism" in the arts) is the view that there are mind-independent aesthetic facts.

== History of metaphysical realism ==
=== Ancient Greek philosophy ===
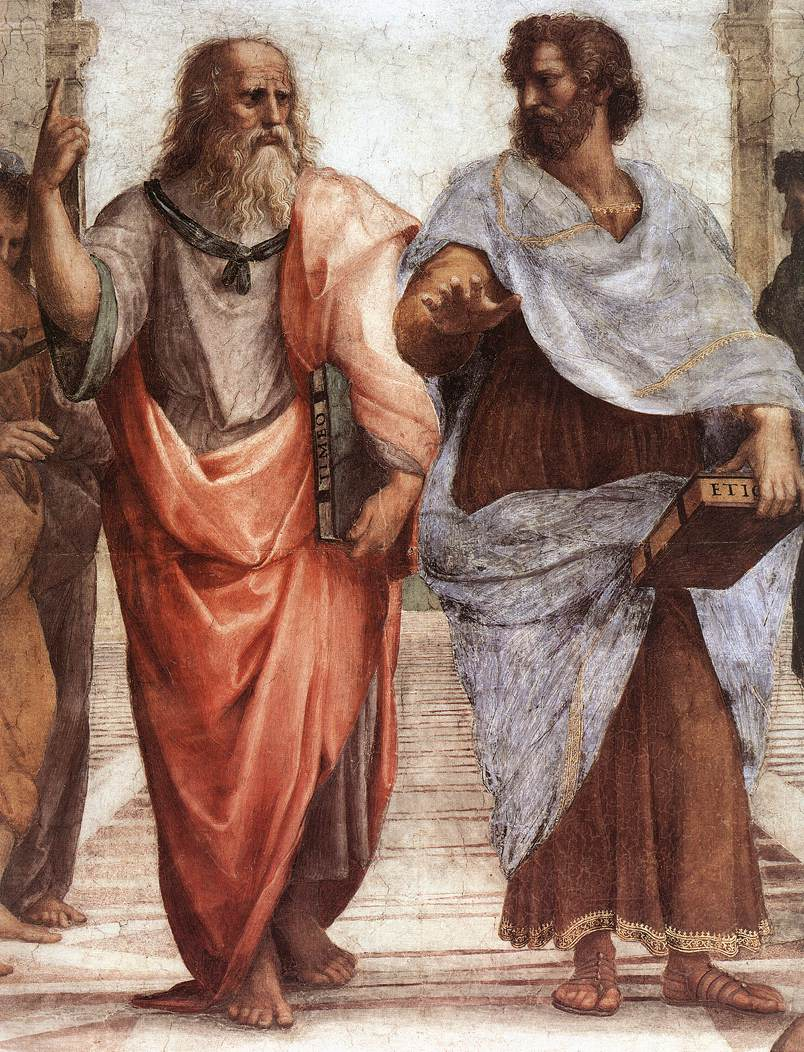
Plato (left) and Aristotle (right), a detail of The School of Athens, a fresco by Raphael. In Plato's metaphysics, ever-unchanging Forms, or Ideas, exist apart from particular physical things, and are related to them as their prototype or exemplar. Aristotle's philosophy of reality also aims at the universal. Aristotle finds the universal, which he calls essence, in the commonalities of particular things.

In ancient Greek philosophy, realist doctrines about universals were proposed by Plato and Aristotle.

Platonic realism is a radical form of realism regarding the existence of abstract objects, including universals, which are often translated from Plato's works as "Forms". Since Plato frames Forms as ideas that are literally real (existing even outside of human minds), this stance is also called Platonic idealism. This should not be confused with "idealistic" in the ordinary sense of "optimistic" or with other types of philosophical idealism, as presented by philosophers such as George Berkeley. As Platonic abstractions are not spatial, temporal, or subjectively mental, they are arguably not compatible with the emphasis of Berkeley's idealism grounded in mental existence. Plato's Forms include numbers and geometrical figures, making his theory also include mathematical realism; they also include the Form of the Good, making it additionally include ethical realism.

In Aristotle's more modest view, the existence of universals (like "blueness") is dependent on the particulars that exemplify them (like a particular "blue bird", "blue piece of paper", "blue robe", etc.), and those particulars exist independent of any minds: classic metaphysical realism.

=== Ancient Indian philosophy ===
There were many ancient Indian realist schools, such as the Mimamsa, Vishishtadvaita, Dvaita, Nyaya, Yoga, Samkhya, Sauntrantika, Jain, Vaisesika, and others. They argued for their realist positions, and heavily criticized idealism, like that of the Yogachara and Advaita Vedanta, and composed refutations of the Yogacara position.

=== Medieval philosophy ===
Medieval realism developed out of debates over the problem of universals. Universals are terms or properties that can be applied to many things, such as "red", "beauty", "five", or "dog". Realism (also known as exaggerated realism) in this context, contrasted with conceptualism and nominalism, holds that such universals really exist, independently and somehow prior to the world. Moderate realism holds that they exist, but only insofar as they are instantiated in specific things; they do not exist separately from the specific thing. Conceptualism holds that they exist, but only in the mind, while nominalism holds that universals do not "exist" at all but are no more than words (flatus vocis) that describe specific objects.

Proponents of moderate realism included Thomas Aquinas, Bonaventure, and Duns Scotus (cf. Scotist realism).

=== Early modern philosophy ===
In early modern philosophy, Scottish Common Sense Realism was a school of philosophy which sought to defend naive realism against philosophical paradox and scepticism, arguing that matters of common sense are within the reach of common understanding and that common-sense beliefs even govern the lives and thoughts of those who hold non-commonsensical beliefs. It originated in the ideas of the most prominent members of the Scottish School of Common Sense, Thomas Reid, Adam Ferguson and Dugald Stewart, during the 18th century Scottish Enlightenment and flourished in the late 18th and early 19th centuries in Scotland and America.

The roots of Scottish Common Sense Realism can be found in responses to such philosophers as John Locke, George Berkeley, and David Hume. The approach was a response to the "ideal system" that began with Descartes' concept of the limitations of sense experience and led Locke and Hume to a skepticism that called religion and the evidence of the senses equally into question. The common sense realists found skepticism to be absurd and so contrary to common experience that it had to be rejected. They taught that ordinary experiences provide intuitively certain assurance of the existence of the self, of real objects that could be seen and felt and of certain "first principles" upon which sound morality and religious beliefs could be established. Its basic principle was enunciated by its founder and greatest figure, Thomas Reid:

If there are certain principles, as I think there are, which the constitution of our nature leads us to believe, and which we are under a necessity to take for granted in the common concerns of life, without being able to give a reason for them—these are what we call the principles of common sense; and what is manifestly contrary to them, is what we call absurd.

=== Late modern philosophy ===
In late modern philosophy, a notable school of thought advocating metaphysical realism was Austrian realism. Its members included Franz Brentano, Alexius Meinong, Vittorio Benussi, Ernst Mally, and early Edmund Husserl. These thinkers stressed the objectivity of truth and its independence of the nature of those who judge it. (See also Graz School.)

Dialectical materialism, a philosophy of nature based on the writings of late modern philosophers Karl Marx and Friedrich Engels, is interpreted to be a form of ontological realism.

According to Michael Resnik, Gottlob Frege's work after 1891 can be interpreted as a contribution to realism.

=== Contemporary philosophy ===
In contemporary analytic philosophy, Bertrand Russell, J. L. Austin, Karl Popper, and Gustav Bergmann espoused metaphysical realism. Hilary Putnam initially espoused metaphysical realism, but he later embraced a form of anti-realism that he termed "internal realism." Conceptualist realism (a view put forward by David Wiggins) is a form of realism, according to which our conceptual framework maps reality.

Speculative realism is a movement in contemporary continental-inspired philosophy that defines itself loosely in its stance of metaphysical realism against the dominant forms of post-Kantian philosophy.

== See also ==
- Critical realism
- Dialectical realism
- Epistemological realism
- Extended modal realism
- Legal realism
- Objectivism
- Realism (disambiguation)
- Truth-value link realism
