= The Subject =

The Subject may refer to:

- The Subject (2018 film), a Canadian animated short film
- The Subject (2020 film), an American drama film

== See also ==
- Subject (disambiguation)
