= Object =

Object may refer to:

== General meanings ==
- Object (philosophy), a thing, being, item, or concept
  - Object (abstract), an object which does not exist at any particular time or place
  - Physical object, an identifiable collection of matter
- Goal, an aim, target, or objective
- Object (grammar), a sentence element, such as a direct object or an indirect object

== Science, technology, and mathematics ==
=== Computing ===
- 3D model, a representation of a physical object
- Object (computer science), a language mechanism for binding data with methods that operate on that data
  - Object-orientation (disambiguation), in which concepts are represented as objects
    - Object-oriented programming (OOP), in which an object is an instance of a class or array
  - Object (IBM i), the fundamental unit of data storage in the IBM i operating system
- Object file, the output of a compiler or other translator program (also known as "object code")
- HTML object element

=== Mathematics ===
- Object (mathematics), an abstract object arising in mathematics
- Group object, a generalization of a group built on more complicated structures than sets
- Object, an entity treated by mathematical category theory

=== Physics ===
- Physical body or object, in physics, an identifiable collection of matter
  - Planetary body or planetary object, any secondary body in the Solar System that has a planet-like geology

=== Other sciences ===
- Astronomical object
- In object relations theory of psychoanalysis, that to which a subject relates

== Arts and media ==
- Object (Le Déjeuner en fourrure), a sculpture by Méret Oppenheim
- An Object, an album by No Age, 2013
- "Object", a song by the Cure from Three Imaginary Boys, 1979
- "Object", a song by Ween from La Cucaracha, 2007
- The Object, a prop used by Hipgnosis for the Led Zeppelin album Presence
- Object show, a microgenre of web animation

== Other uses ==
- Object language (disambiguation)
- Object (National Register of Historic Places), a classification used by the U.S. National Register of Historic Places
- Object: Australian Design Centre, a non-profit organisation promoting design in Australia
- Object theory (disambiguation)
- Объект (object), (Russian GABTU), military vehicle designations

== See also ==
- Artifact (disambiguation)
- Objection (disambiguation)
- Objective (disambiguation)
- Objet d'art, works of art that are not paintings; large or medium-sized sculptures, prints or drawings
