= Artifact =

Artifact (American English) or artefact (British English) may refer to:

== Science and technology ==
- Artifact (error), misleading or confusing alteration in data or observation, commonly in experimental science, resulting from flaws in technique or equipment
  - Compression artifact, a loss of clarity caused by the data compression of an image, audio, or video
  - Digital artifact, any undesired alteration in data introduced during its digital processing
  - Sonic artifact, in sound and music production, sonic material that is accidental or unwanted, resulting from the editing of another sound.
  - Visual artifact, anomalies during visual representation of digital graphics and imagery
- In the scrum software project management framework, documentation used for managing the project

=== Archaeology ===
- Artifact (archaeology), an object formed by humans, particularly one of interest to archaeologists
- The Artefact (journal), published annually by the Archaeological and Anthropological Society of Victoria

=== Computing ===
- Artifact (software development), one of many kinds of tangible by-products produced during the development of software
- Artifact (enterprise architecture), a separate component of enterprise architecture
- Virtual artifact, an object in a digital environment
- Artifact (UML), a term in the Unified Modeling Language
- Artifact (app), a news recommendation app for iOS and Android

=== Cultural studies ===
- Cultural artifact, in the social sciences, anything created by humans which gives information about the culture of its creator and users

== Arts and media ==
=== Film and television ===
- Artifact (film), a 2012 documentary film directed by Jared Leto under the pseudonym of Bartholomew Cubbins
- Artifacts (film), a 2007 horror film
- The Artifact (Eureka), a fictional object appearing in the TV series Eureka

=== Games ===
- Artifact (Dungeons & Dragons), the most powerful type of magic item in Dungeons & Dragons
- Artifact (Magic: The Gathering), a card type in the trading card game Magic: The Gathering
- Artifact (video game), a 2018 digital collectible card game by Valve

=== Music ===
- Artifacts (group), a hip-hop duo from New Jersey
- Artifact (album), a 2002 album by The Electric Prunes
- Artifacts (Beirut album), 2022
- Artifacts (Nicole Mitchell album), 2015
- Artifacts (Steve Roach album), 1994
- Artifact, a 2019 album by Swedish electronic musician Waveshaper
- "Artefact", a song by Phoenix from Alpha Zulu, 2022
- "Artifact", a lyric in "Hits Different" from Midnights by Taylor Swift, 2022
- Artefact #VII, a type of Theremin

=== Other media ===
- Artifact (ballet), 1984 ballet by William Forsythe
- Artifact, a 1985 science fiction novel by Gregory Benford

== Other uses ==
- Artifact Creek, a stream in British Columbia, Canada
- Artifact Ridge, a mountain ridge in British Columbia, Canada
- Artifacting, a technique used on some older computers to generate color in monochrome modes by exploiting artifacts of analog television systems
- Learning artifact (education), an object created by students during the course of instruction
- A relic, an object left behind by a prophet or other important religious figure

== See also ==
- Object (disambiguation)
- Artiifact, a 2016 album by South African hip hop record producer Anatii
- Artifakt, a compilation album by Better Than Ezra
- Artifakts (bc), a 1998 album by Plastikman
- Different spellings and connotations for artefact or artifact
- Magic item, in fantasy, any object that has magical powers so powerful that it cannot be duplicated or destroyed by ordinary means
