= Occurrence =

Occurrence may refer to:

- Occurrence (type–token distinction), concept in type–token distinction
- Occurrence (liturgical), Catholic liturgical term that covers the process when two liturgical offices coincide on the same day
