= Linda Wetzel =

American philosopher (born 1951)

- Born: 1951 (age 74–75)

Philosophical work
- Era: 21st-century philosophy
- Region: Western philosophy
- School: Analytic
- Institutions: Georgetown University

Linda Wetzel (born 1951) is an American philosopher and Associate Professor Emeritus of Philosophy at Georgetown University. She is known for her works on types and tokens.

== Books ==
- Types and Tokens: On Abstract Objects, MIT Press, 2009, ISBN 9780262013017
