= Class (philosophy) =

Group of things derived from extensional or intensional definition

A class is a collection whose members either fall under a predicate or are classified by a rule. Hence, while a set can be extensionally defined only by its elements, a class has also an intensional dimension that unites its members. When the term 'class' is applied so that it includes those sets whose elements are intended to be collected without a common predicate or rule, the distinction can be indicated by calling such sets "improper class."

Philosophers sometimes distinguish classes from types and kinds. The class of human beings is discussed, as well as the type (or natural kind), human being, or humanity. While both are typically treated as abstract objects and not different categories of being, types not classes are usually treated as universals. Whether natural kinds ought to be considered universals is vexed; see natural kind.

Types and kinds are discussed differently. Socrates is considered a token of a type (or an instance of the natural kind, human being) but a member of the class of human beings. He is a token (instance) not member of the type (kind), human being. He is a member not type (or kind) of a class. The terminology is that types (or kinds) have tokens (or instances) while classes have members.

A class is conceptualized similarly to a set defined by its members. The class is extensional. A set defined intensionally is a set of things that meet some requirement to be a member. Such a set creates a type. It also creates a class from the extension of the intensional set. A type always has a corresponding (potentially empty) class, but a class does not necessarily have a corresponding type.
