= Roscellinus =

French theologian, c. 1050 – c. 1121

Roscelin of Compiègne (c. 1050 – c. 1121), better known by his Latinized name Roscellinus Compendiensis or Rucelinus, was a French philosopher and theologian, often regarded as the founder of nominalism.

== Biography ==
Roscellinus was born in Compiègne, France. Little is known of his life, and knowledge of his doctrines is mainly derived from Anselm and Abelard. He studied at Soissons and Reims, was afterwards attached to the cathedral of Chartres and became canon of Compiègne. As a monk of Compiègne, he was teaching as early as 1087. He had contact with Lanfranc, Anselm, and St. Ivo of Chartres.

Roscellinus's exposition of Nominalist doctrines, and especially his application to the dogma of the Trinity, attracted broad attention. He maintained that the three persons of the Trinity were not referred to as three substances or Gods only by convention, arguing that if they were really one substance then God the Father and the Holy Spirit would have become incarnate along with God the Son. Roscellinus cited Lanfranc and Anselm in support of this doctrine.

In 1092/1093, however, a council convoked at Soissons by the archbishop of Reims condemned his interpretation and accused Roscellinus of tritheism. (Note: Roscelin's writings and the council's acts have not survived and we know about them principally through the correspondence and writings of Anselm.) Roscellinus, out of fear of excommunication and even stoning to death by the orthodox populace, recanted his beliefs, but later returned to professing them.

Roscellinus left for England, but having made himself unpopular by an attack on the doctrines of Anselm, he left the country and repaired to Rome, where he was well received and became reconciled to the Catholic Church. He then returned to France, taught at Tours and Loc-menach (where he had Abelard as a pupil), and finally became canon of Besançon. He is heard of as late as 1121, when he came forward to oppose Abelard's views on the Trinity. He was also sent a letter by Theobald of Étampes in response to his criticisms of the sons of priests.

Of his writings there exists only a letter addressed to Abelard on the Trinity, in which Roscellinus "belittles Abélard and makes merry over his castration." Hauréau brings forward his name in connection with a text, "Sententia de universalibus secundum magistrum R.", but this is a conjecture. His doctrines are attested by Anselm, Abelard, John of Salisbury, and an anonymous epigram.

== Nominalism ==
According to Otto of Freisingen, Roscellinus "was the first in our times to institute the theory of words", but the chronicler of the "Historia Francia" mentions before him a "magister Johannes", whose personality is much discussed and who has not yet been definitively identified.

The "sententia vocum" was one of the anti-realist solutions of the problem of universals accepted in the early Middle Ages. In accordance with a dichotomy set out by Porphyry, the first medieval philosophers regarded genera and species either as things or as having no existence. The philosophers described this using terminology drawn from Boethius, referring to such abstract concepts as either res (things) or voces (words). Nominalists held that:

1. only the individual exists (is res);
2. universals are merely words (voces).

In Roscellinus's theory, the universal is merely an emission of sound (flatus vocis), in conformity with Boethius' definition. Because Roscellinus did not discuss the philosophical concepts of genus and species, he is sometimes considered a pseudo-nominalist, or a moderate realist. However, because of his position as the first medieval philosopher to challenge medieval Realism, he has also been invoked as a forefather of modernity.

Roscellinus was also taken to task by Anselm and Abelard for the less clear idea which he gave of the whole and of composite substance. According to Anselm, he maintained that colour does not exist independently of the horse which serves as its support and that the wisdom of the soul is not outside of the soul which is wise. Anselm argues that Roscellinus denies to the whole, such as house, man, real existence of its parts, treating the word alone as having parts.

Roscellinus was not without his supporters; among them was his contemporary Raimbert of Lille, and what the monk Hériman relates of his doctrine agrees with the statements of the master of Compiègne. Universal substances, says Hériman, are but a breath. He merely comments on the saying of Anselm characterized by the same jesting tone, and says that to understand the windy loquacity of Raimbert of Lille one has but to breathe into his hand.

== Tritheism of Roscelin ==
Roscelin considered the three Divine Persons as three independent beings, like three angels; if usage permitted, he added, it might truly be said that there are three Gods. Otherwise, he continued, God the Father and God the Holy Ghost would have become incarnate with God the Son. To retain the appearance of dogma he admitted that the three Divine Persons had but one will and power [Audio ... quod Roscelinus clericus dicit in tres personas esse tres res ab invicem separatas, sicut sunt tres angeli, ita tamen ut una sit voluntas et potestas aut Patrem et Spiritum sanctum esse incarnatum; et tres deos vere posse dici si usus admitteret (letter of Anselm to Foulques)].

This characteristic tritheism, which Anselm and Abelard agreed in refuting even after its author's conversion, seems an indisputable application of Roscelin's anti-Realism. He even argues that if the three Divine Persons form but one God, all three have become incarnate. There are therefore three Divine substances, three Gods, as there are three angels, because each substance constitutes an individual, which is the fundamental assertion of anti-Realism. The ideas of the theologian are closely linked with those of the philosopher.
