= Subject matter =

Subject matter, in general, is anything which can be content for some theory.

Subject matter may refer to:

- Patentable subject matter (or statutory subject matter), defining whether patent protection is available
- Subject-matter jurisdiction, determining the kinds of claims or disputes over which a court has jurisdiction
- Subject-matter expert, an expert in a particular area
- Subject matter expert Turing test, a variation of the Turing test where a computer system attempts to replicate an expert in a given field
- Aboutness, the concept that a text, utterance, image, or action is on or of
- Subject (documents), in library science

== See also ==
- Subject (disambiguation)
