= Odo of Tournai =

Early 12th-century bishop of Cambrai

Odo of Tournai, also known as Odoardus or Odo of Orléans (1060–1113), was a Benedictine monk, scholar and bishop of Cambrai (from 1105/6).

== Biography ==
Odo was born at Orléans. In 1087 he was invited by the canons of Tournai to teach in that city, and there soon won a great reputation. He became a Benedictine monk (1095) in St. Martin's Abbey, Tournai, of which he became abbot later. In 1105 he was chosen Bishop of Cambrai, and was consecrated during a synod at Reims. For some time after he was unable to obtain possession of his see owing to his refusal to receive investiture at the hands of Emperor Henry IV, but the latter's son Henry restored the See of Cambrai to Odo in 1106.

He laboured diligently for his diocese, but in 1110 he was exiled on the ground that he had never received the cross and ring from the emperor. Odo retired to Anchin Abbey, near Pecquencourt, where he died without regaining possession of his diocese.

== Works and translations ==
Many of his works are lost. His treatise De peccato originali in three books, composed between 1095 and 1105, discuss the problem of universals, and of genera and species from a realist viewpoint.

- De peccato originali libri tres Migne, Patrologia Latina, vol. CLX, col. 1071–1102.
- On Original Sin and A Disputation with the Jew, Leo, Concerning the Advent of Christ, the Son of God. Two Theological Treatises, Translated and edited by Irven M. Resnick, Philadelphia, University of Pennsylvania Press, 1994.

According to Herman of Tournai, Odo "delighted in the number of scribes that the Lord had given him, so that if you went into the cloister you would commonly see twelve young monks seated in chairs and writing in silence at carefully and skilfully made desks".

== Bibliography ==
- I. M. Resnick (1997), Odo of Tournai, the Phoenix, and the Problem of Universals, Journal of the History of Philosophy, Volume 35, Number 3, pp. 355–374.
- Christophe Erismann, L’homme commun. La genèse du réalisme ontologique durant le haut Moyen Âge, Vrin 2011. (Chapter VI: Odon de Cambrai, pp. 331–362).
- Druckenmüller, Tina: Schüler oder bloß Kenner? Das Verhältnis von Odo von Tournai zu Anselm von Canterbury. In: Wissens-Ordnung. Beiträge für Eva Schlotheuber hg. von Theo Schley, Marieke Neuburg, Isabel Dillenberger und Eva Neufeind, Regensburg 2026, S. 93-125.

== See also ==
- Raimbert of Lille
