= Moderate realism =

Concept in philosophy

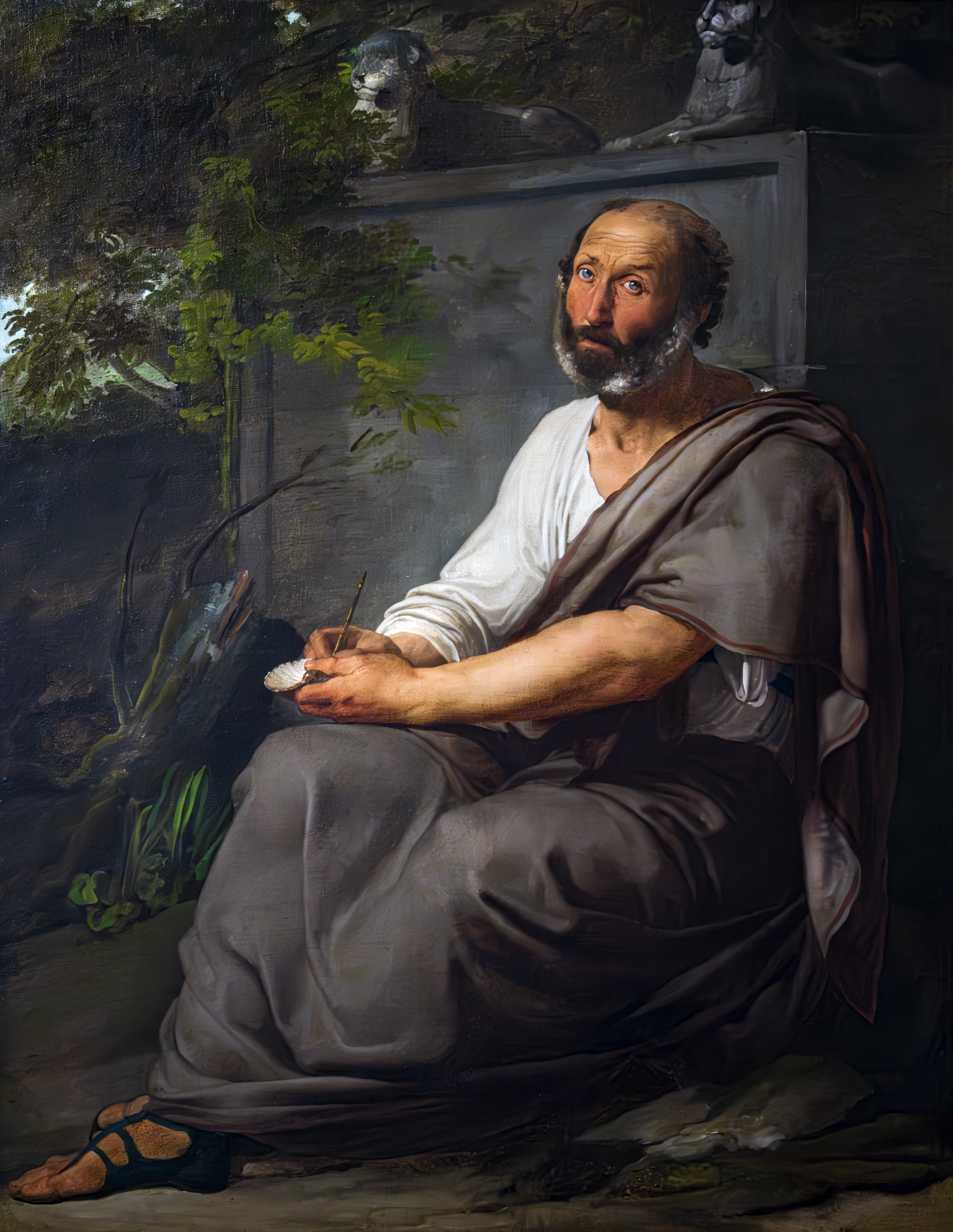
Aristotle, by Francesco Hayez

Moderate realism (also called immanent realism) is a position in the debate on the metaphysics of universals which holds that there is no realm in which universals exist (in opposition to Platonic realism, which asserts the existence of abstract objects), nor do they really exist within particulars as universals, but rather universals really exist within particulars as particularised, and multiplied.

== Overview ==
Moderate realism is opposed to both the theory of Platonic forms and nominalism. Nominalists deny the existence of universals altogether, even as particularised and multiplied within particulars. Moderate realism, however, is considered a midpoint between Platonic realism and nominalism as it holds that the universals are located in space and time although they do not have separate realms.

Aristotle espoused a form of moderate realism as did Thomas Aquinas, Bonaventure, and Duns Scotus (cf. Scotist realism). Moderate realism is anti-realist about abstract objects, just like conceptualism is (their difference being that conceptualism denies the mind-independence of universals, while moderate realism does not). Aristotle's position, as expounded by Aquinas, denies the existence of the realm of Forms and that the world around constitutes the only world where nothing is existing precisely according to our universal concepts.

== Modern theories ==
A more recent and influential version of immanent realism has been advanced by Willard Van Orman Quine, in works such as "Posits and Reality" (1955), and D. M. Armstrong, in works such as his Universals: An Opinionated Introduction (1989, p. 8). For Quine, any object proposed by theory is considered real, stressing that "everything to which we concede existence is a posit from the standpoint of a description of the theory-building process", considering the idea that the theory withstood rigorous testing. According to Armstrong, universals are independent of the mind, and this is critical in accounting for causation and nomic connection.

== See also ==
- Abstract object
- Conceptualist realism
- Hylomorphism
- In re structuralism
- Instantiation principle
- Medieval realism
- Model-dependent realism
- Nominalism
- Object (philosophy)
- Platonic form
- Strong realism
- Universal (metaphysics)
