= Conceptualism =

Metaphysical theory

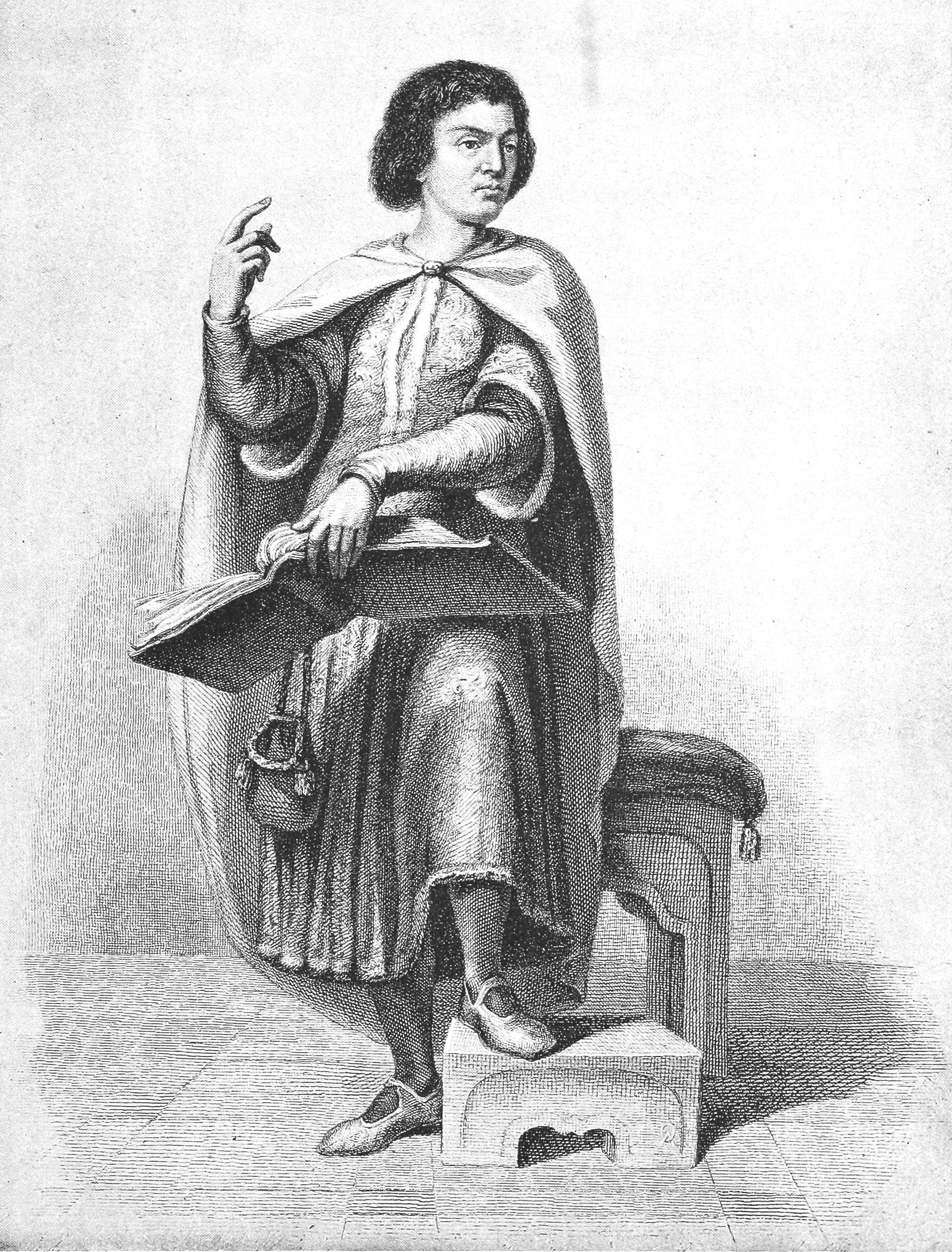
Peter Abelard, a French philosopher, theologian and preeminent logician, put forward the theory of conceptualism.

In metaphysics, conceptualism is a theory that explains universality of particulars as conceptualized frameworks situated within the thinking mind. Intermediate between nominalism and realism, the conceptualist view approaches the metaphysical concept of universals from a perspective that denies their presence in particulars outside the mind's perception of them. Conceptualism is anti-realist about abstract objects, just like immanent realism is (their difference being that immanent realism accepts there are mind-independent facts about whether universals are instantiated).

== History ==
=== Medieval philosophy ===
The evolution of late scholastic terminology led to the emergence of conceptualism, which stemmed from doctrines that were previously considered to be nominalistic. The terminological distinction was made in order to stress the difference between the claim that universal mental acts correspond with universal intentional objects and the perspective that dismissed the existence of universals outside the mind. The former perspective of rejection of objective universality was distinctly defined as conceptualism.

Peter Abélard was a medieval thinker whose work is currently classified as having the most potential in representing the roots of conceptualism. Abélard’s view denied the existence of determinate universals within things. William of Ockham was another famous late medieval thinker who had a strictly conceptualist solution to the metaphysical problem of universals. He argued that abstract concepts have no fundamentum outside the mind.

In the 17th century conceptualism gained favour for some decades especially among the Jesuits: Pedro Hurtado de Mendoza, Rodrigo de Arriaga and Francisco Oviedo are the main figures. Although the order soon returned to the more realist philosophy of Francisco Suárez, the ideas of these Jesuits had a great impact on the early modern philosophy.

=== Modern philosophy ===
Conceptualism was either explicitly or implicitly embraced by most of the early modern thinkers, including René Descartes, John Locke, Baruch Spinoza, Gottfried Wilhelm Leibniz, George Berkeley, and David Hume – often in a quite simplified form if compared with the elaborate scholastic theories.

Sometimes the term is applied even to the radically different philosophy of Immanuel Kant, who holds that universals have no connection with things as they are in themselves because they (universals) are exclusively produced by our a priori mental structures and functions, even though the categories have an objective validity for objects of experience (that is, phenomena).

In late modern philosophy, conceptualist views were held by G. W. F. Hegel.

=== Contemporary philosophy ===
In contemporary times, Edmund Husserl's philosophy of mathematics has been construed as a form of conceptualism.

Conceptualist realism (a view put forward by David Wiggins in 1980) states that our conceptual framework maps reality.

Though separate from the historical debate regarding the status of universals, there has been significant debate regarding the conceptual character of experience since the release of Mind and World by John McDowell in 1994. McDowell's touchstone is the famous refutation that Wilfrid Sellars provided for what he called the "Myth of the Given"—the notion that all empirical knowledge is based on certain assumed or 'given' items, such as sense data. Thus, in rejecting the Myth of the Given, McDowell argues for perceptual conceptualism, according to which perceptual content is conceptual "from the ground up", that is, all perceptual experience is a form of conceptual experience. McDowell's philosophy of justification is considered a form of foundationalism: it is a form of foundationalism because it allows that certain judgements are warranted by experience and it is a coherent form of this view because it maintains that experience can warrant certain judgements because experience is irreducibly conceptual.

A clear motivation of contemporary conceptualism is that the kind of perception that rational creatures like humans enjoy is unique in the fact that it has conceptual character. McDowell explains his position:

I have urged that our perceptual relation to the world is conceptual all the way out to the world’s impacts on our receptive capacities. The idea of the conceptual that I mean to be invoking is to be understood in close connection with the idea of rationality, in the sense that is in play in the traditional separation of mature human beings, as rational animals, from the rest of the animal kingdom. Conceptual capacities are capacities that belong to their subject’s rationality. So another way of putting my claim is to say that our perceptual experience is permeated with rationality. I have also suggested, in passing, that something parallel should be said about our agency.

McDowell's conceptualism, though rather distinct (philosophically and historically) from conceptualism's genesis, shares the view that universals are not "given" in perception from outside the sphere of reason. Particular objects are perceived, as it were, already infused with conceptuality stemming from the spontaneity of the rational subject herself.

The retroactive application of the term "perceptual conceptualism" to Kant's philosophy of perception is debatable. Robert Hanna has argued for a rival interpretation of Kant's work termed perceptual non-conceptualism.

== See also ==
- Conceptual architecture
- Conceptual art
- Conceptual framework
- Intuitionism
- Lyco art (lyrical conceptualism), term coined by artist Paul Hartal
- Perspectivism
