= Objectivity =

Objectivity can refer to:

- Subjectivity and objectivity (philosophy), either the property of being independent from or dependent upon perception
  - Objectivity (science), the goal of eliminating personal biases in the practice of science
  - Journalistic objectivity, encompassing fairness, disinterestedness, factuality, and nonpartisanship
- Objectivity, a YouTube channel by Brady Haran
- Principle of material objectivity, a principle in continuum mechanics
- Objectivity/DB, an object-oriented database management system produced by Objectivity Inc.

== See also ==
- Neutrality (philosophy)
- New Objectivity, German 1920s art movement
- New Objectivity (architecture), a name often given to the Modern architecture of German-speaking Europe in the 1920s and 30s
- Objective (disambiguation)
- Objectivism (disambiguation)
