= Subjective =

Subjective may refer to:

== Philosophy ==
- Subjectivity, a personal perspective, feelings, beliefs, desires or discovery
  - Subjective experience, the subjective quality of conscious experience
- Subjectivism, a philosophical tenet that accords primacy to subjective experience as fundamental of all measure and law
- Subject (philosophy), who has subjective experiences or a relationship with another entity

== Other uses ==
- Subjective case, grammatical case for a noun
- Subjective theory of value, an economic theory of value
- Subjective, a school of Bayesian probability stating that the state of knowledge corresponds to personal belief
- Subjectivity (journal), an academic journal

== See also ==
- Subjectivist (horse)
- Subjectivist fallacy
- Subjunctive
- Objective (disambiguation)
