= Subject =

Subject (Latin: subiectus "lying beneath") may refer to:

== Philosophy ==
- Hypokeimenon, or subiectum, in metaphysics, the "internal", non-objective being of a thing
  - Subject (philosophy), a being that has subjective experiences, subjective consciousness, or a relationship with another entity

== Linguistics ==
- Subject (grammar), who or what a sentence or a clause is about
- Subject case or nominative case, one of the grammatical cases for a noun

== Music ==
- Subject (music), or 'theme'
- The melodic material presented first in a fugue
- Either of the two main groups of themes (first subject, second subject), in sonata form
- Subject (album), a 2003 album by Dwele
- Subjects (album), a 2021 album by Scale the Summit

== Science and technology ==
- The individual, whether an adult person, a child or infant, or an animal, who is the subject of research.

=== Computing ===
- Subjects (programming), core elements in the subject-oriented programming paradigm
- Subject (access control)
- An element in the Resource Description Framework

=== Library science and information science ===
- Subject (documents) (subject classification; subject indexing; subject searching)
- Subject term or index term, a descriptor of a document used in bibliographic records

== Other uses ==
- Commoner, an individual subjected to rule by an elite, e.g. in feudalism
- Subject in a constitutional monarchy, e.g. British subject
- Course (education), a unit of academic instruction
- Subject, a 2022 documentary about documentaries by Jennifer Tiexiera

== See also ==
- Subject matter (disambiguation)
- Subjective (disambiguation)
