= Literary nominalism =

Aspect of philosophy

Literary nominalism is a paradigm of thought that is interested in the interconnections between certain aspects of nominalist philosophy and theology and works of literature.

== History of the term ==
While the presence of nominalist ideas in fiction and poetry has been discussed by scholars at least since the nineteenth century, the paradigm was first consolidated in 1985 in an essay by Joseph Quack who called the German modernist writer Alfred Andersch a "literary nominalist". In 1991, Richard Utz applied the paradigm to Geoffrey Chaucer's Troilus and Criseyde, claiming that the late medieval English writer might show correspondences with the wave of anti-realist/nominalist thought engendered by William of Ockham and his intellectual contemporaries and successors, and coining the paradigm "literary nominalism" in the process. Since the early 1990s, various scholars have added their voices to the discussion of the paradigm, either to confirm or critique its value for literary studies. Various other terms, especially Ockhamism, have also been used especially in claims for the influence of William of Ockham on individual writers and their works. Prior to Quack and Utz, Umberto Eco's novel, The Name of the Rose (1980; English translation in 1983), had rekindled interest in the conflict between late medieval nominalism and realism. Eco's playful and ironic confrontation of both movements of thought questioned the somewhat simplistic separation present in mainstream histories of philosophy and theology.

== Main features ==
Among the specific features writers of nominalism have found attractive for their practices are:

- the construction of a narrative that centers on the ontological status of universals and particulars (with a preference for the latter);
- the focus on the radical contingency of language (confirming that there is nothing except names);
- the challenging of allegorical (hence: Neoplatonic 'realist') forms of narrative, character, and argument;
- the experimentation with non-conclusive, contingent, indeterminate, and fragmentary poetic structures;
- the likening of the relationship between the God's absolute and ordinate powers on the one hand, and God and humanity, rulers, subjects, and authors on the other.

Most discussions of literary nominalism center on the late medieval period and early modern periods, when many of the epistemological foundations of Neoplatonic realism were challenged. The majority of such discussions of literary nominalism have centered on the works of Geoffrey Chaucer, but also included Jean Molinet, the Pearl Poet, François Rabelais, John Skelton, Julian of Norwich, Chrétien de Troyes, the York and Townely Plays, Renaissance plays, Jonathan Swift, Miguel de Cervantes, and John Milton. A famous postmodern writer, Jorge Luis Borges, took an inimical stand towards nominalism in his short story, "Funes the Memorious".

== References and further reading ==
- Christoph Bode, “A Modern Debate over Universals? Critical Theory vs.‘Essentialism’,” The European Legacy 2.2 (1997), 229–37.
- John D. Cox, “Nominalist Ethics and the New Historicism,” Christianity and Literature 39.2 (1990), 127–39.
- Robert S. Dupree, “Coleridge, Peirce, and Nominalism,” in: Semiotics, ed. C.W. Spinks and John Deely (New York: Peter Lang, 1996), pp. 233–41.
- Miguel-Angel Garrido-Gallardo, “Nominalismo y literatura,” Anthropos: Revista de Documentacion Cientifica de la Cultura 129 (1992), 55–58.
- Jens F. Ihwe, Eric Vos, and Heleen Pott, Worlds Made from Words: Semiotics from a Nominalistic Point of View. Amsterdam: University of Amsterdam, Department of General Literary Studies, 2002.
- Arild Linneberg and Geir Mork, “Antinomies of Nominalism: Postmodernism in Norwegian Fiction of the 1980s,” in: Postmodern Fiction in Europe and the Americas, ed. Theo D’haen and Hans Bertens (Amsterdam: Rodopi, 1988), pp. 45–62.
- Richard Utz and Terry Barakat, "Medieval Nominalism and the Literary Questions: Selected Studies." Perspicuitas
- Richard Utz, "Literary Nominalism," in: Oxford Dictionary of the Middle Ages. Ed. Robert E. Bjork. Oxford: Oxford University Press, 2010. Vol. III, p. 1000.
