= Objection =

Objection may refer to:

- Objection (United States law), a motion during a trial to disallow a witness's testimony or other evidence
- Objection (argument), used in informal logic and argument mapping
  - Inference objection, a special case of the above
  - Counterargument, in informal logic, an objection to an objection
- Objection to the consideration of a question, in parliamentary procedure
- "Objection (Tango)", a song by Shakira
- Objection! (video game), a 1992 MS-DOS videogame
- Objection!, a staple line in the video game franchise Ace Attorney

== See also ==
- Object (disambiguation)
