= Learning artifact (education) =

In educational psychology, a learning artifact (or educational artifact) is an object created by students during the course of instruction. To be considered an artifact, an object needs to be lasting, durable, public, and materially present. Under the constructionist theory of educational psychology, the concept of making knowledge visible is a central component. The creation of material artifacts is a technique used to allow students to display their knowledge in a public forum (usually the classroom). Artifacts can be in the form of paintings, drawings, sculptures, models, or anything else that is not erased after completion.

Students create evocative objects for the purpose of making their knowledge visible. The creation and display of these artifacts allow students opportunities for engagement, revision and feedback, all hallmarks of quality learning design.

A cognitive artifact is a physical representation of a conceptual idea, such as an experience, a memory, a thought, or a feeling. The term is used in the discipline of human-computer interaction. Cognitive artifacts can take on different forms, and are intended to aid or enhance one's cognitive abilities. Because a cognitive artifact is a representation of a conceptual idea, the artifact may be interpreted in different ways. Cognitive artifacts use various mediums that often differ from the medium in which the situation initially occurred. These artifacts focus on the essentials, disregarding any irrelevant material in order to simplify the situation and elicit the most critical information from a particular scenario.
