= Object-orientation =

Object-oriented may refer to:

- Object-oriented ontology, a 21st-century school of thought rejecting anthropocentrism
- Object-oriented writing, a literary and visual art practice developed by Travis Jeppesen

== Computing ==
- Object-oriented analysis and design, an object-oriented approach to analysis and design
- Object-oriented database, a database that is object-oriented
- Object-oriented modeling, an object-oriented approach to modeling
- Object-oriented operating system, an operating system that is object-oriented
- Object-oriented programming, an object-oriented approach to programming
- Object-oriented role analysis and modeling, an object-oriented approach to role analysis and modeling
- Object-oriented user interface, a user interface that is object-oriented
