= Subjectivity (journal) =

- Discipline: Psychology, sociology
- Language: English
- Edited by: Lisa Blackman, Valerie Walkerdine

Publication details
- Former name(s): Critical Psychology
- History: 2008–present
- Publisher: Palgrave Macmillan, Springer (United Kingdom)
- Frequency: Quarterly

Standard abbreviations
- ISO 4: Subjectivity

Indexing
- ISSN: 1755-6341 (print); 1755-635X (web)
- OCLC no.: 298782630

Links
- Journal homepage; Online access; Online archive

Subjectivity is a peer-reviewed academic journal published quarterly in psychology and sociology. It was founded in 2008 as a successor to Critical Psychology and is published by Palgrave Macmillan.

== Abstracting and indexing ==
The journal is abstracted and indexed in the following bibliographic databases:

- Academic Search Premier
- Educational Research Abstracts
- Emerging Sources Citation Index
- International Bibliography of the Social Sciences
- MLA - Modern Language Association Database
- PsycINFO
- Scopus
- Sociological Abstracts
