= Object language =

Object language can refer to

- The language that is described by a metalanguage.
- A language which is the object of a formal specification.
- The target language of a translator.
