= Universal (metaphysics) =

Characteristic or qualities that particular things have in common

In metaphysics, a universal is what particular things have in common, namely characteristics or qualities. In other words, universals are repeatable or recurrent entities that can be instantiated or exemplified by many particular things. For example, suppose there are two chairs in a room, each of which is green. These two chairs share the quality of "chairness", as well as "greenness" or the quality of being green; in other words, they share two "universals". There are three major kinds of qualities or characteristics: types or kinds (e.g. mammal), properties (e.g. short, strong), and relations (e.g. father of, next to). These are all different types of universals.

Paradigmatically, universals are abstract (e.g. humanity), whereas particulars are concrete (e.g. the personhood of Socrates). However, universals are not necessarily abstract and particulars are not necessarily concrete. For example, one might hold that numbers are particular yet abstract objects. Likewise, some philosophers, such as D. M. Armstrong, consider universals to be concrete.

Most do not consider classes to be universals, although some prominent philosophers do, such as John Bigelow.

== Problem of universals ==
The problem of universals is an ancient problem in metaphysics on the existence of universals. The problem arises from attempts to account for the phenomenon of similarity or attribute agreement among things. For example, grass and Granny Smith apples are similar or agree in attribute, namely in having the attribute of greenness. The issue is how to account for this sort of agreement in attribute among things.

There are many philosophical positions regarding universals. Taking "beauty" as an example, four positions are:

- Idealism: beauty is a property constructed in the mind, so it exists only in descriptions of things.
- Platonic extreme realism: beauty is a property that exists in an ideal form independently of any mind or thing.
- Aristotelian moderate realism or conceptualism: beauty is a property of things (fundamentum in re) that the mind abstracts from these beautiful things.
- Nominalism: there are no universals, only individuals.

Taking a broader view, the main positions are generally considered classifiable as: extreme realism, nominalism (sometimes simply named "anti-realism" with regard to universals), moderate realism, and idealism. Extreme Realists posit the existence of independent, abstract universals to account for attribute agreement. Nominalists deny that universals exist, claiming that they are not necessary to explain attribute agreement. Conceptualists posit that universals exist only in the mind, or when conceptualized, denying the independent existence of universals, but accepting they have a fundamentum in re. Complications which arise include the implications of language use and the complexity of relating language to ontology.

== Particular ==
A universal may have instances, known as its particulars. For example, the type dog (or doghood) is a universal, as are the property red (or redness) and the relation betweenness (or being between). Any particular dog, red thing, or object that is between other things is not a universal, however, but is an instance of a universal. That is, a universal type (doghood), property (redness), or relation (betweenness) inheres in a particular object (a specific dog, red thing, or object between other things).

== Platonic realism ==
Platonic realism holds universals to be the referents of general terms, such as the abstract, nonphysical, non-mental entities to which words such as "sameness", "circularity", and "beauty" refer. Particulars are the referents of proper names, such as "Phaedo," or of definite descriptions that identify single objects, such as the phrase, "that person over there". Other metaphysical theories may use the terminology of universals to describe physical entities.

Plato's examples of what we might today call universals included mathematical and geometrical ideas such as a circle and natural numbers as universals. Plato's views on universals did, however, vary across several different discussions. In some cases, Plato spoke as if the perfect circle functioned as the form or blueprint for all copies and for the word definition of circle. In other discussions, Plato describes particulars as "participating" in the associated universal.

Contemporary realists agree with the thesis that universals are multiply-exemplifiable entities. Examples include by D. M. Armstrong, Nicholas Wolterstorff, Reinhardt Grossmann, Michael Loux.

== Nominalism ==
Nominalists hold that universals are not real mind-independent entities but either merely concepts (sometimes called "conceptualism") or merely names. Nominalists typically argue that properties are abstract particulars (like tropes) rather than universals. JP Moreland distinguishes between "extreme" and "moderate" nominalism. Examples of nominalists include Buddhist logicians and apoha theorists, the medieval philosophers Roscelin of Compiègne and William of Ockham and contemporary philosophers W. V. O. Quine, Wilfrid Sellars, D. C. Williams, and Keith Campbell.

== Ness-ity-hood principle ==
The ness-ity-hood principle is used mainly by English-speaking philosophers to generate convenient, concise names for universals or properties. According to the Ness-Ity-Hood Principle, a name for any universal may be formed by taking the name of the predicate and adding the suffix "ness", "ity", or "hood". For example, the universal that is distinctive of left-handers may be formed by taking the predicate "left-handed" and adding "ness", which yields the name "left-handedness". The principle is most helpful in cases where there is not an established or standard name of the universal in ordinary English usage: What is the name of the universal distinctive of chairs? "Chair" in English is used not only as a subject (as in "The chair is broken"), but also as a predicate (as in "That is a chair"). So to generate a name for the universal distinctive of chairs, take the predicate "chair" and add "ness", which yields "chairness".

== See also ==
- Hypostatic abstraction
- Philosophy of mathematics
- Sortal
- Transcendental nominalism
- The Secret of Hegel
- Universality (philosophy)
- Universalism
