= Nominalism =

Philosophy emphasizing names and labels

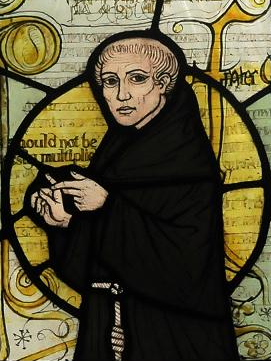
William of Ockham

In metaphysics, nominalism is the view that universals and abstract objects do not actually exist other than being merely names or labels. There are two main versions of nominalism. One denies the existence of universals—that which can be instantiated or exemplified by many particular things (e.g., strength, humanity). The other version specifically denies the existence of abstract objects as such—objects that do not exist in space and time.

Most nominalists have held that only physical particulars in space and time are real, and that universals exist only post res, that is, subsequent to particular things. However, some versions of nominalism hold that some particulars are abstract entities (e.g., numbers), whilst others are concrete entities – entities that do exist in space and time (e.g., pillars, snakes, and bananas). Nominalism is primarily a position on the problem of universals. It is opposed to realist philosophies, such as Platonic realism, which assert that universals do exist over and above particulars, and to the hylomorphic substance theory of Aristotle, which asserts that universals are immanently real within them; however, the name "nominalism" emerged from debates in medieval philosophy with Roscellinus.

The term nominalism stems from the Latin nomen, "name". John Stuart Mill summarised nominalism in his aphorism "there is nothing general except names". In philosophy of law, nominalism finds its application in what is called constitutional nominalism.

== History ==
=== Ancient Greek philosophy ===
Plato was perhaps the first writer in Western philosophy to clearly state a realist, i.e., non-nominalist, position:

... We customarily hypothesize a single form in connection with each of the many things to which we apply the same name. ... For example, there are many beds and tables. ... But there are only two forms of such furniture, one of the bed and one of the table. (Republic 596a–b, trans. Grube)

What about someone who believes in beautiful things, but doesn't believe in the beautiful itself ...? Don't you think he is living in a dream rather than a wakened state? (Republic 476c)

The Platonic universals corresponding to the names "bed" and "beautiful" were the Form of the Bed and the Form of the Beautiful, or the Bed Itself and the Beautiful Itself. Platonic Forms were the first universals posited as such in philosophy.

Our term "universal" is due to the English translation of Aristotle's technical term katholou which he coined specially for the purpose of discussing the problem of universals. Katholou is a contraction of the phrase kata holou, meaning "on the whole".

Aristotle famously rejected certain aspects of Plato's Theory of Forms, but he clearly rejected nominalism as well:

... 'Man', and indeed every general predicate, signifies not an individual, but some quality, or quantity or relation, or something of that sort. (Sophistical Refutations xxii, 178b37, trans. Pickard-Cambridge)

The first philosophers to explicitly describe nominalist arguments were the Stoics, especially Chrysippus.

=== Medieval philosophy ===
In medieval philosophy, the French philosopher and theologian Roscellinus (c. 1050 – c. 1125) was an early, prominent proponent of nominalism. Nominalist ideas can be found in the work of Peter Abelard and reached their flowering in William of Ockham, who was the most influential and thorough nominalist. Abelard's and Ockham's version of nominalism is sometimes called conceptualism, which presents itself as a middle way between nominalism and realism, asserting that there is something in common among like individuals, but that it is a concept in the mind, rather than a real entity existing independently of the mind. Ockham argued that only individuals existed and that universals were only mental ways of referring to sets of individuals. "I maintain", he wrote, "that a universal is not something real that exists in a subject ... but that it has a being only as a thought-object in the mind [objectivum in anima]". As a general rule, Ockham argued against assuming any entities that were not necessary for explanations. Accordingly, he wrote, there is no reason to believe that there is an entity called "humanity" that resides inside, say, Socrates, and nothing further is explained by making this claim. This is in accord with the analytical method that has since come to be called Ockham's razor, the principle that the explanation of any phenomenon should make as few assumptions as possible. Critics argue that conceptualist approaches answer only the psychological question of universals. If the same concept is correctly and non-arbitrarily applied to two individuals, there must be some resemblance or shared property between the two individuals that justifies their falling under the same concept and that is just the metaphysical problem that universals were brought in to address, the starting-point of the whole problem (MacLeod & Rubenstein, 2006, §3d). If resemblances between individuals are asserted, conceptualism becomes moderate realism; if they are denied, it collapses into nominalism.

=== Modern and contemporary philosophy ===
In modern philosophy, nominalism was revived by Thomas Hobbes and Pierre Gassendi.

In contemporary analytic philosophy, it has been defended by Rudolf Carnap, Nelson Goodman, H. H. Price, and D. C. Williams.

Lately, some scholars have been questioning what kind of influences nominalism might have had in the conception of modernity and contemporaneity. According to Michael Allen Gillespie, nominalism profoundly influences these two periods. Even though modernity and contemporaneity are secular eras, their roots are firmly established in the sacred. Furthermore, "Nominalism turned this world on its head," he argues. "For the nominalists, all real being was individual or particular and universals were thus mere fictions."

Another scholar, Victor Bruno, follows the same line. According to Bruno, nominalism is one of the first signs of rupture in the medieval system. "The dismembering of the particulars, the dangerous attribution to individuals to a status of totalization of possibilities in themselves, all this will unfold in an existential fissure that is both objective and material. The result of this fissure will be the essays to establish the nation state."

=== Indian philosophy ===
Indian philosophy encompasses various realist and nominalist traditions. Certain orthodox Hindu schools defend the realist position, notably Purva Mimamsa, Nyaya and Vaisheshika, maintaining that the referent of the word is both the individual object perceived by the subject of knowledge and the universal class to which the thing belongs. According to Indian realism, both the individual and the universal exist objectively, with the second underlying the former.

Buddhists take the nominalist position, especially those of the Sautrāntika and Yogācāra schools; they were of the opinion that words have as referent not true objects, but only concepts produced in the intellect. These concepts are not real since they do not have efficient existence, that is, causal powers. Words, as linguistic conventions, are useful to thought and discourse, but even so, it should not be accepted that words apprehend reality as it is.

Dignāga formulated a nominalist theory of meaning called apohavada, or theory of exclusions. The theory seeks to explain how it is possible for words to refer to classes of objects even if no such class has an objective existence. Dignāga's thesis is that classes do not refer to positive qualities that their members share in common. On the contrary, universal classes are exclusions (apoha). As such, the "cow" class, for example, is composed of all exclusions common to individual cows: they are all non-horse, non-elephant, etc.

== The problem of universals ==
Nominalism arose in reaction to the problem of universals, specifically accounting for the fact that some things are of the same type. For example, Fluffy and Kitzler are both cats, or, the fact that certain properties are repeatable, such as: the grass, the shirt, and Kermit the Frog are green. One wants to know by virtue of what are Fluffy and Kitzler both cats, and what makes the grass, the shirt, and Kermit green.

The Platonist answer is that all the green things are green in virtue of the existence of a universal: a single abstract thing that, in this case, is a part of all the green things. With respect to the color of the grass, the shirt and Kermit, one of their parts is identical. In this respect, the three parts are literally one. Greenness is repeatable because there is one thing that manifests itself wherever there are green things.

Nominalism denies the existence of universals. The motivation for this flows from several concerns, the first one being where they might exist. Plato famously held, on one interpretation, that there is a realm of abstract forms or universals apart from the physical world (see theory of the forms). Particular physical objects merely exemplify or instantiate the universal. But this raises the question: Where is this universal realm? One possibility is that it is outside space and time. A view sympathetic with this possibility holds that, precisely because some form is immanent in several physical objects, it must also transcend each of those physical objects; in this way, the forms are "transcendent" only insofar as they are "immanent" in many physical objects. In other words, immanence implies transcendence; they are not opposed to one another. (Nor, in this view, would there be a separate "world" or "realm" of forms that is distinct from the physical world, thus shirking much of the worry about where to locate a "universal realm".) However, naturalists assert that nothing is outside of space and time. Some Neoplatonists, such as the pagan philosopher Plotinus and the Christian philosopher Augustine, imply (anticipating conceptualism) that universals are contained within the mind of God. To complicate things, what is the nature of the instantiation or exemplification relation?

Conceptualists hold a position intermediate between nominalism and realism, saying that universals exist only within the mind and have no external or substantial reality.

Moderate realists hold that there is no realm in which universals exist, but rather there universals are located in space and time however they are manifest. Suppose that a universal, for example greenness, is supposed to be a single thing. Nominalists consider it unusual that there could be a single thing that exists in multiple places simultaneously. The realist maintains that all the instances of greenness are held together by the exemplification relation, but that this relation cannot be explained. Additionally, in lexicology there is an argument against color realism, namely the subject of the blue-green distinction. In some languages the equivalent words for blue and green may be colexified (and furthermore there may not be a straightforward translation either – in Japanese "青", which is usually translated as "blue", is sometimes used for words which in English may be considered as "green" (such as green apples).)

Finally, many philosophers prefer simpler ontologies populated with only the bare minimum of types of entities, or as W. V. O. Quine said "They have a taste for 'desert landscapes.'" They try to express everything that they want to explain without using universals such as "catness" or "greenness."

== Varieties ==
There are various forms of nominalism ranging from extreme to almost-realist. One extreme is predicate nominalism, which states that Fluffy and Kitzler, for example, are both cats simply because the predicate 'is a cat' applies to both of them. And this is the case for all similarity of attribute among objects. The main criticism of this view is that it does not provide a sufficient solution to the problem of universals. It fails to provide an account of what makes it the case that a group of things warrant having the same predicate applied to them.

Proponents of resemblance nominalism believe that 'cat' applies to both cats because Fluffy and Kitzler resemble an exemplar cat closely enough to be classed together with it as members of its kind, or that they differ from each other (and other cats) quite less than they differ from other things, and this warrants classing them together. Some resemblance nominalists will concede that the resemblance relation is itself a universal, but is the only universal necessary. Others argue that each resemblance relation is a particular, and is a resemblance relation simply in virtue of its resemblance to other resemblance relations. This generates an infinite regress, but many argue that it is not vicious.

Class nominalism argues that class membership forms the metaphysical backing for property relationships: two particular red balls share a property in that they are both members of classes corresponding to their properties – that of being red and of being balls. A version of class nominalism that sees some classes as "natural classes" is held by Anthony Quinton.

Conceptualism is a philosophical theory that explains universality of particulars as conceptualized frameworks situated within the thinking mind. The conceptualist view approaches the metaphysical concept of universals from a perspective that denies their presence in particulars outside of the mind's perception of them.

Another form of nominalism is trope nominalism. A trope is a particular instance of a property, like the specific greenness of a shirt. One might argue that there is a primitive, objective resemblance relation that holds among like tropes. Another route is to argue that all apparent tropes are constructed out of more primitive tropes and that the most primitive tropes are the entities of complete physics. Primitive trope resemblance may thus be accounted for in terms of causal indiscernibility. Two tropes are exactly resembling if substituting one for the other would make no difference to the events in which they are taking part. Varying degrees of resemblance at the macro level can be explained by varying degrees of resemblance at the micro level, and micro-level resemblance is explained in terms of something no less robustly physical than causal power. David Armstrong, perhaps the most prominent contemporary realist, argues that such a trope-based variant of nominalism has promise, but holds that it is unable to account for the laws of nature in the way his theory of universals can.

Ian Hacking has also argued that much of what is called social constructionism of science in contemporary times is actually motivated by an unstated nominalist metaphysical view. For this reason, he claims, scientists and constructionists tend to "shout past each other".

Mark Hunyadi characterizes the contemporary Western world as a figure of a "libidinal nominalism." He argues that the insistence on the individual will that has emerged in medieval nominalism evolves into a "libidinal nominalism" in which desire and will are conflated.

=== Mathematical nominalism ===
A notion that philosophy, especially ontology and the philosophy of mathematics, should abstain from set theory owes much to the writings of Nelson Goodman (see especially Goodman 1940 and 1977), who argued that concrete and abstract entities having no parts, called individuals, exist. Collections of individuals likewise exist, but two collections having the same individuals are the same collection. Goodman was himself drawing heavily on the work of Stanisław Leśniewski, especially his mereology, which was itself a reaction to the paradoxes associated with Cantorian set theory. Leśniewski denied the existence of the empty set and held that any singleton was identical to the individual inside it. Classes corresponding to what are held to be species or genera are concrete sums of their concrete constituting individuals. For example, the class of philosophers is nothing but the sum of all concrete, individual philosophers.

The principle of extensionality in set theory assures us that any matching pair of curly braces enclosing one or more instances of the same individuals denote the same set. Hence {a, b}, {b, a}, {a, b, a, b} are all the same set. For Goodman and other proponents of mathematical nominalism, {a, b} is also identical to {a, {b} }, {b, {a, b} }, and any combination of matching curly braces and one or more instances of a and b, as long as a and b are names of individuals and not of collections of individuals. Goodman, Richard Milton Martin, and Willard Quine all advocated reasoning about collectivities by means of a theory of virtual sets (see especially Quine 1969), one making possible all elementary operations on sets except that the universe of a quantified variable cannot contain any virtual sets.

In the foundations of mathematics, nominalism has come to mean doing mathematics without assuming that sets in the mathematical sense exist. In practice, this means that quantified variables may range over universes of numbers, points, primitive ordered pairs, and other abstract ontological primitives, but not over sets whose members are such individuals. Only a small fraction of the corpus of modern mathematics can be rederived in a nominalistic fashion.

== Criticisms ==
=== Historical origins of the term ===
As a category of late medieval thought, the concept of 'nominalism' has been increasingly queried. Traditionally, the fourteenth century has been regarded as the heyday of nominalism, with figures such as John Buridan and William of Ockham viewed as founding figures. However, the concept of 'nominalism' as a movement (generally contrasted with 'realism'), first emerged only in the late fourteenth century, and only gradually became widespread during the fifteenth century. The notion of two distinct ways, a via antiqua, associated with realism, and a via moderna, associated with nominalism, became widespread only in the later fifteenth century – a dispute which eventually dried up in the sixteenth century.

Aware that explicit thinking in terms of a divide between 'nominalism' and 'realism’ emerged only in the fifteenth century, scholars have increasingly questioned whether a fourteenth-century school of nominalism can really be said to have existed. While one might speak of family resemblances between Ockham, Buridan, Marsilius and others, there are also striking differences. More fundamentally, Robert Pasnau has questioned whether any kind of coherent body of thought that could be called 'nominalism' can be discerned in fourteenth century writing. This makes it difficult, it has been argued, to follow the twentieth century narrative which portrayed late scholastic philosophy as a dispute which emerged in the fourteenth century between the via moderna, nominalism, and the via antiqua, realism, with the nominalist ideas of William of Ockham foreshadowing the eventual rejection of scholasticism in the seventeenth century.

=== Nominalist reconstructions in mathematics ===
A critique of nominalist reconstructions in mathematics was undertaken by Burgess (1983) and Burgess and Rosen (1997). Burgess distinguished two types of nominalist reconstructions. Thus, hermeneutic nominalism is the hypothesis that science, properly interpreted, already dispenses with mathematical objects (entities) such as numbers and sets. Meanwhile, revolutionary nominalism is the project of replacing current scientific theories by alternatives dispensing with mathematical objects (see Burgess, 1983, p. 96). A recent study extends the Burgessian critique to three nominalistic reconstructions: the reconstruction of analysis by Georg Cantor, Richard Dedekind, and Karl Weierstrass that dispensed with infinitesimals; the constructivist re-reconstruction of Weierstrassian analysis by Errett Bishop that dispensed with the law of excluded middle; and the hermeneutic reconstruction, by Carl Boyer, Judith Grabiner, and others, of Cauchy's foundational contribution to analysis that dispensed with Cauchy's infinitesimals.

== See also ==
- Concrete (philosophy)
- Dynamic nominalism
- Idea
- Ideas Have Consequences
- Linguistic relativity
- Literary nominalism
- Object
- Psychological nominalism
- School of Names
- Substantial form
- Transcendental nominalism

== References and further reading ==
- Adams, Marilyn McCord. William of Ockham (2 volumes) Notre Dame, IN: Notre Dame University Press, 1987.
- American Heritage Dictionary of the English Language, Fourth Edition, 2000.
- Borges, Jorge Luis (1960). "De las alegorías a las novelas" in Otras inquisiciones (pg 153–56).
- Burgess, John (1983). Why I am not a nominalist. Notre Dame J. Formal Logic 24, no. 1, 93–105.
- Burgess, John & Rosen, Gideon. (1997). A Subject with no Object. Princeton University Press.
- Courtenay, William J. Adam Wodeham: An Introduction to His Life and Writings, Leiden: E. J. Brill, 1978.
- Feibleman, James K. (1962). "Nominalism" in Dictionary of Philosophy, Dagobert D. Runes (ed.). Totowa, NJ: Littlefield, Adams, & Co. (link)
- Goodman, Nelson (1977) The Structure of Appearance, 3rd ed. Kluwer.
- Hacking, Ian (1999). The Social Construction of What?, Harvard University Press.
- Karin Usadi Katz and Mikhail G. Katz (2011) A Burgessian Critique of Nominalistic Tendencies in Contemporary Mathematics and its Historiography. Foundations of Science. doi:10.1007/s10699-011-9223-1 See link
- Mill, J. S., (1872). An Examination of William Hamilton's Philosophy, 4th ed., Chapter XVII.
- Oberman, Heiko. The Harvest of Medieval Theology: Gabriel Biel and Late Medieval Nominalism, Grand Rapids, MI: Baker Academic, 2001.
- Penner, T. (1987). The Ascent from Nominalism, D. Reidel Publishing.
- Peters, F. (1967). Greek Philosophical Terms, New York University Press.
- Price, H. H. (1953). "Universals and Resemblance", Ch. 1 of Thinking and Experience, Hutchinson's University Library.
- Quine, W. V. O. (1961). "On What There is," in From a Logical Point of View, 2nd/ed. N.Y: Harper and Row.
- Quine, W. V. O. (1969). Set Theory and Its Logic, 2nd ed. Harvard University Press. (Ch. 1 includes the classic treatment of virtual sets and relations, a nominalist alternative to set theory.)
- Robson, John Adam, Wyclif and the Oxford Schools: The Relation of the "Summa de Ente" to Scholastic Debates at Oxford in the Late Fourteenth Century, Cambridge, England: Cambridge University Press, 1961.
- Utz, Richard, "Literary Nominalism." Oxford Dictionary of the Middle Ages. Ed. Robert E. Bjork. Oxford: Oxford University Press, 2010. Vol. III, p. 1000.
- Russell, Bertrand (1912). "The World of Universals," in The Problems of Philosophy, Oxford University Press.
- Williams, D. C. (1953). "On the Elements of Being: I", Review of Metaphysics, vol. 17, pp. 3–18.
