= Objective =

Objective may refer to:

- Objectivity (philosophy), the quality of being confirmed independently of a mind
- Objective (optics), an element in a camera or microscope
- The Objective, a 2008 science fiction horror film
- Objective pronoun, a personal pronoun that is used as a grammatical object
- Objective Media Group, a British television production company
- Goal, a result or possible outcome that a person or a system desires

== See also ==
- Objective 1, 2 and 3, the former objectives of the regional policy of the European Union
- Object (disambiguation)
- Objectivity (disambiguation)
- Objective-C, a programming language
