= Instantiation principle =

Concept in metaphysics and logic

The instantiation principle or principle of instantiation or principle of exemplification is the concept in metaphysics and logic (first put forward by David Malet Armstrong) that there can be no uninstantiated or unexemplified properties (or universals). In other words, it is impossible for a property to exist which is not had by some object.

The existence of properties or universals is not tied to their actual existence now, but to their existence in space-time considered as a whole. Thus, any property which is, has been, or will be instantiated exists. The property of being red would exist even if all red things were to be destroyed, because it has been instantiated. This broadens the range of properties which exist if the principle is true.

Those who endorse the principle of instantiation are known as in re (in thing or in reality) realists or 'immanent realists'.

Difficulties for the instantiation principle arise from the existence of truths about the uninstantiated, for example about higher infinities, or about an uninstantiated shade of blue (if such a shade exists). Those truths appear to be about something, but what can their truthmaker be if they do not in some sense exist?

== See also ==
- In re structuralism
