= Particular =

Concept in metaphysics

In metaphysics, particulars or individuals are usually contrasted with universals. Universals concern features that can be exemplified by various different particulars.

Particulars are often seen as concrete, spatiotemporal entities as opposed to abstract entities, such as properties or numbers. There are, however, theories of abstract particulars or tropes. For example, Socrates is a particular (there's only one Socrates-the-teacher-of-Plato and one cannot make copies of him, e.g., by cloning him, without introducing new, distinct particulars). Redness, by contrast, is not a particular, because it is abstract and multiply instantiated (for example a bicycle, an apple, and a particular woman's hair can all be red). In the nominalist view, everything is particular. A universal at each moment in time, from the point of view of an observer, is a set of particulars.

== Overview ==
Sybil Wolfram writes:

Particulars include only individuals of a certain kind: as a first approximation individuals with a definite place in space and time, such as persons and material objects or events, or which must be identified through such individuals, like smiles or thoughts.

Some terms are used by philosophers with a rough-and-ready idea of their meaning. This can occur if there is a lack of agreement about the best definition of the term. In formulating a solution to the problem of universals, the term 'particular' can be used to describe the particular instance of redness of a certain apple as opposed to the 'universal' 'redness' (being abstract).

The term particular is also used as a modern equivalent of the Aristotelian notion of individual substance. Used in this sense, particular can mean any concrete (individual) entity, irrespective of whether it is spatial and temporal.

== See also ==
- Epistemological particularism
- Moral particularism
- Type–token distinction
- Particular affirmative/negative
- Rigid designator
