= Problem of universals =

Philosophical question

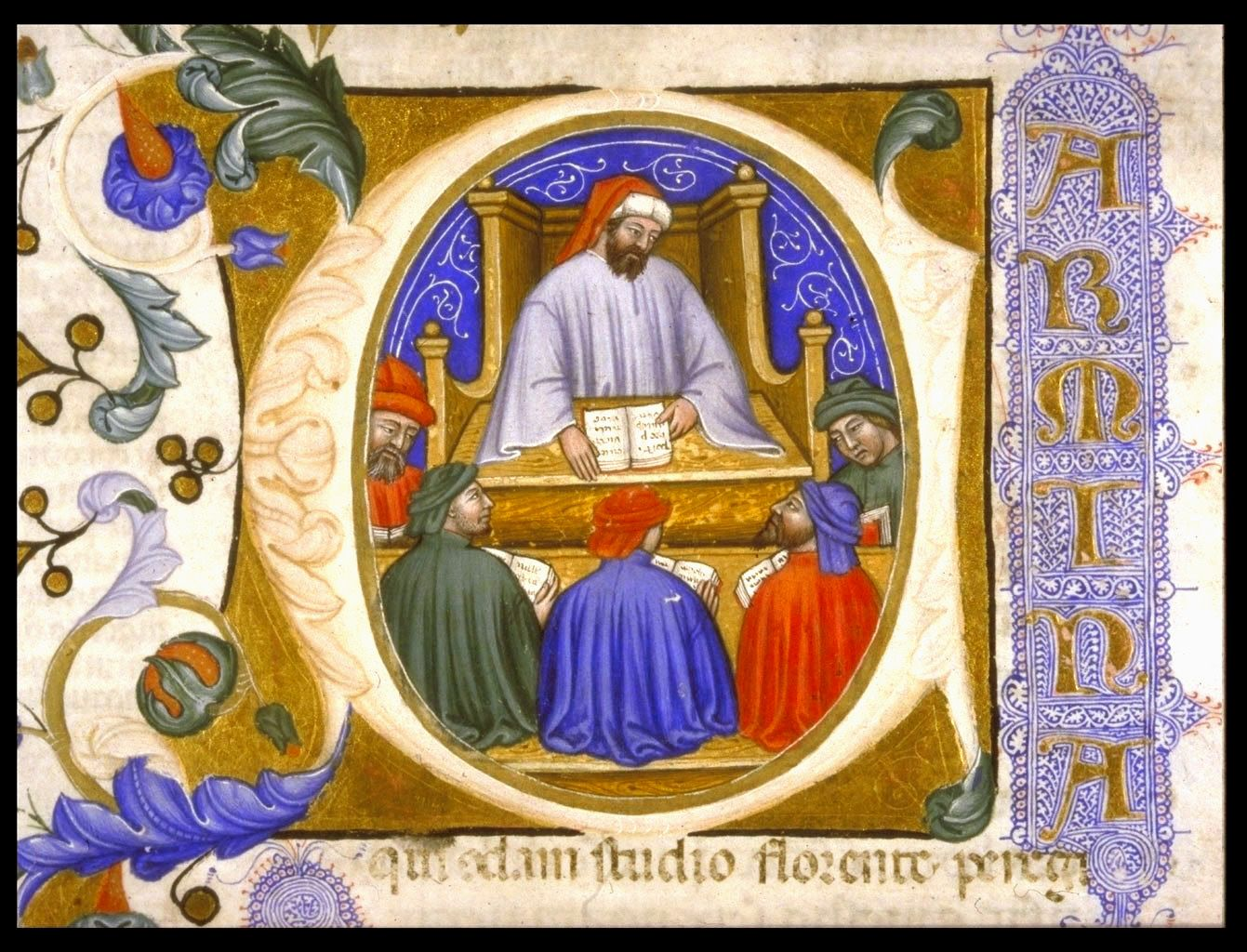
Boethius teaching his students

The problem of universals is an ancient question from metaphysics that has inspired a range of philosophical topics and disputes: "Should the properties an object has in common with other objects, such as color and shape, be considered to exist beyond those objects? And if a property exists separately from objects, what is the nature of that existence?"

Universals are qualities or relations found in two or more entities. As an example, if all cup-holders are circular in some way, then circularity may be considered a universal property of cup-holders. Similarly, if one has a set of seven red and three blue balls, it would seem that though the set comprises ten separate entities (balls), there are only two colors therein—each being shared by multiple balls. Many properties can be universal: being human, red, male or female, liquid or solid, big or small, etc.

The problem of universals relates to various inquiries within metaphysics, logic, and epistemology, dating from as far back as Plato and Aristotle, in efforts to understand how the same single property can be (at least apparently) shared across multiple, non-identical objects. Philosophers agree that human beings can talk and think about universals, but disagree on whether universals exist in reality beyond mere thought and speech.

== Ancient philosophy ==
The problem of universals is considered a central issue in traditional metaphysics and can be traced back to the philosophy of Plato and Aristotle, particularly in their attempts to explain the nature and status of forms. These philosophers explored the problem through analyses of predication, qualities, and knowledge.

=== Plato ===
Plato theorized a sharp distinction between the sensible world of concrete objects and the intelligible world of abstract universals or Forms (eide; sg. eidos): one merely has beliefs and opinions about the former, but may obtain true knowledge of the latter. For Plato, it was not possible to have genuine knowledge of that which is changeable and particular, since such knowledge must be forever unfailing and general; thus, the world of the Forms is the more real or fundamental world, like objects seen in sunlight, while the sensible world is only imperfectly or derivatively real, like the shadows cast by those objects. This Platonic realism, however, in denying that the eternal Forms are mental artifacts, differs sharply with modern forms of idealism.

One of the first nominalist critiques of Plato's realism was that of Diogenes of Sinope, who said "I've seen Plato's cups and table, but not his 'cupness' and 'tableness'." (Note: As recorded in Diogenes Laërtius' Lives; Plato is said to have responded: "Naturally—for you have the eyes with which to see a cup and a table, but not the mind with which to comprehend 'tableness' and 'cupness'.")

=== Aristotle ===
Plato's student Aristotle disagreed with his tutor: Aristotle transformed Plato's forms into "formal causes", the blueprints or essences of individual things. Whereas Plato idealized geometry, Aristotle emphasized nature and related disciplines, and therefore much of his thinking concerns living beings and their properties. The nature of universals in Aristotle's philosophy therefore hinges upon his view of natural kinds. Instead of categorizing being according to the structure of thought, he proposed that categorical analysis be directed at the structure of the natural world. He used the principle of predication in his Categories, wherein he established that universal terms are involved in a relation of predication if some facts expressed by ordinary sentences hold.

In his work On Interpretation, he explains that a "universal" is that which may be predicated of many, whereas that which is "singular" may not be. For instance, man is a universal, whereas Callias is a singular; both universals (e.g., a genus, such as "animal", and/or species, such as "man") and singulars may be predicated of an individual man (e.g., Callias is both a man and Callias).

Aristotle elsewhere (Note: Namely, in On Ideas—now surviving only in excerpts relayed by Alexander of Aphrodisias' commentary on Aristotle's Metaphysics—and Metaphysics I.) contends—working, at least initially, from the Platonic principle that what is most universal is also (in some sense) most real—that universals are the proper objects of scientific study: since any given sensible thing is changeable, singular, and not wholly definable, (Note: E.g., the definition of human being may include reference to the possession of flesh and bone—but Socrates' designated matter (this flesh, this bone) is not captured thereby, nor will be any accidental features that the flesh of Socrates may possess.) whereas the form or essence thereof is—grasped as a universal—enduring, general, and definite, it is the latter that is apt to serve in causes and explanations (i.e., the sort of knowledge with which scientific understanding is concerned).

For example, consider a particular oak tree: this is a member of a species; it has much in common with other oak trees, past, present and future. Its universal—its oakness—is a part of it; hence, one can study oak trees and learn about "oakness", and, more generally, about the intelligible order within the sensible world. Accordingly, Aristotle was more confident than Plato about coming to know the sensible world; he was a prototypical empiricist and a founder of induction. Aristotle was a new, moderate sort of realist about universals.

== Medieval philosophy ==
=== Boethius ===
The problem was introduced to the medieval world by Boethius (c. AD 480 – 524), in his translation of Porphyry's Isagoge. It begins:

I shall omit to speak about genera and species, as to whether they subsist (in the nature of things) or in mere conceptions only; whether also if subsistent, they are bodies or incorporeal, and whether they are separate from, or in, sensibles, and subsist about these, for such a treatise is most profound, and requires another more extensive investigation.

Boethius, in his commentaries on the aforementioned translation, says that a universal—if it were to exist—has to fulfill several criteria: it must be wholly present in each of several particulars, simultaneously and not in a temporal succession, and in an identical manner in each. He further reasons that universals cannot be mind-independent (i.e., cannot have a real existence), because a quality cannot be both one thing and common to many particulars in such a way that it forms part of a particular's substance, as it would then be partaking of both universality and particularity at once—an apparent contradiction. However, he also reasons that universals cannot be solely of the mind, since a mental construct of some quality is an abstraction and understanding of something outside of the mind; thus, either this representation is a true understanding of the quality—in which case we revert to the earlier problem faced by those who believe universals are real—or, if the mental abstraction was not a true understanding, then "what is understood otherwise than the thing is false."

Boethius' solution to this problem was to propose that the mind is able to separate in thought that which is not, necessarily, so separable in reality; he cites the human mind's ability to abstract from concrete particulars as an instance of this. This, according to Boethius, avoids the problem of Platonic universals being out there in the real world, but also the problem of their being purely constructs of the mind: universals are simply the mind thinking about particulars in an abstract, universal way.

=== Medieval realism ===
Boethius mostly stayed close to Aristotle in his thinking about universals. Realism's biggest proponents in the Middle Ages, however, came to be Thomas Aquinas and Duns Scotus. Aquinas argued that both the essence of a thing and its existence were clearly distinct; in this regard he is also Aristotelian.

Duns Scotus argues that in a thing there is no real distinction between the essence and the existence; instead, there is only a formal distinction. Scotus believed that universals exist only inside the things that they exemplify, and that they "contract" with the haecceity of the thing to create the individual. As a result of his realist position, he argued strongly against both nominalism and conceptualism, arguing instead for Scotist realism, a medieval response to the conceptualism of Abelard. That is to say, Scotus believed that such properties as 'redness' and 'roundness' exist in reality and are mind-independent entities.

Furthermore, Duns Scotus wrote about this problem in his own commentary (Quaestiones) on Porphyry's Isagoge, as Boethius had done. Scotus was interested in how the mind forms universals, and he believed this to be "caused by the intellect". This intellect acts on the basis that the nature of, say, 'humanity' that is found in other humans and also that the quality is attributable to other individual humans.

=== Medieval nominalism ===
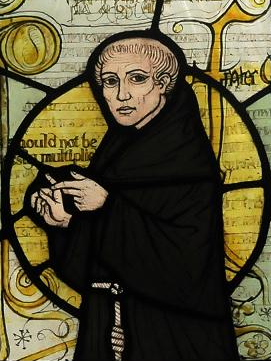
William of Ockham

The opposing view to realism is one called nominalism, which at its strongest maintains that universals are verbal constructs and that they do not inhere in objects or pre-exist them. Therefore, universals in this view are something which are peculiar to human cognition and language. The French philosopher and theologian Roscellinus (1050–1125) was an early, prominent proponent of this view. His particular view was that universals are little more than vocal utterances (voces).

William of Ockham (1285–1347) wrote extensively on this topic. He argued strongly that universals are a product of abstract human thought. According to Ockham, universals are just words or concepts (at best) that only exist in the mind and have no real place in the external world. His opposition to universals was not based on his eponymous Razor, but rather he found that regarding them as real was contradictory in some sense. An early work has Ockham stating that 'no thing outside the soul is universal, either through itself or through anything real or rational added on, no matter how it is considered or understood'. Nevertheless, his position did shift away from an outright opposition to accommodating them in his later works such as the Summae Logicae (albeit in a modified way that would not classify him as a complete realist).

== Modern and contemporary philosophy ==
=== Hegel ===
The 19th-century German philosopher Georg Wilhelm Friedrich Hegel discussed the relation of universals and particulars throughout his works. Hegel posited that both exist in a dialectical relationship to one another; that is, one exists only in relation and in reference to the other.

He stated the following on the issue:

The parts are diverse and independent of each other. They are, however, only parts in their identical relation to each other, or insofar as they, taken together, constitute the whole. But this togetherness is the opposite of the part.

— G.W.F. Hegel, Encyclopedia of the Philosophical Sciences (1830)

=== Mill ===
The 19th-century British philosopher John Stuart Mill discussed the problem of universals in the course of a book that eviscerated the philosophy of Sir William Hamilton. Mill wrote:

The formation of a concept does not consist in separating the attributes which are said to compose it from all other attributes of the same object and enabling us to conceive those attributes, disjoined from any others. We neither conceive them, nor think them, nor cognize them in any way, as a thing apart, but solely as forming, in combination with numerous other attributes, the idea of an individual object.

— as quoted in William James, The Principles of Psychology (1890)

However, he then proceeds to, seemingly, concede the existence of abstract universals—at least, insofar as they may be conceptualized (Note: "[...] This is a lovely example of Mill's way of holding piously to his general statements, but conceding in detail all that their adversaries ask. If there be a better description extant, of a mind in possession of an 'abstract idea,' than is contained in the words [quoted here], I am unacquainted with it. The Berkeleyan nominalism thus breaks down.")—in stating the following:

But, though meaning them only as part of a larger agglomeration, we have the power of fixing our attention on them, to the neglect of the other attributes with which we think them combined. While the concentration of attention lasts, if it is sufficiently intense, we may be temporarily unconscious of any of the other attributes and may really, for a brief interval, have nothing present to our mind but the attributes constituent of the concept.

— as quoted in William James, The Principles of Psychology (1890)

In other words, we may be "temporarily unconscious" of whether an image is white, black, yellow, or purple, and concentrate our attention upon the fact that it is (e.g.) a man, and upon just those attributes necessary to identify it as a man—but not as any particular one. That which we thus conceive may then have the significance of a universal of manhood.

=== Peirce ===
The 19th-century American logician Charles Sanders Peirce, known as the father of pragmatism, developed his own views on the problem of universals in the course of a review of an edition of the writings of George Berkeley. Peirce begins with the observation that "Berkeley's metaphysical theories have at first sight an air of paradox and levity very unbecoming to a bishop." He includes among these paradoxical doctrines Berkeley's denial of "the possibility of forming the simplest general conception", while at the same time "admit[ting] the existence of Platonic ideas". Peirce wrote that if there is some mental fact that works in practice the way that a universal would, that fact is a universal:

If I have learned a formula in gibberish which in any way jogs my memory so as to enable me in each single case to act as though I had a general idea, what possible utility is there in distinguishing between such a gibberish and formula and an idea?

Peirce also held, as a matter of ontology, that what he called "Thirdness"—generalities, laws, general facts about the world—are extra-mental realities.

=== James ===
William James learned about pragmatism from his friend Peirce (though the understanding thereof at which he ultimately arrived was not to Peirce's taste: he came to complain that James had "kidnapped" the term, and to call himself a "pragmaticist" instead). Though James certainly agreed with Peirce and against Berkeley that general ideas exist as a psychological fact, he was an anti-realist (a conceptualist) in his ontology:

Our doctrine, therefore, of the 'fringe' (Note: "Let us use the words psychic overtone, suffusion, or fringe, to designate the influence of a faint brain-process upon our thought, as it makes it aware of relations and objects but dimly perceived. [... T]he fringe, as I use the word, [...] is part of the object cognized, – substantive qualities and things appearing to the mind in a fringe of relations.") leads to a perfectly satisfactory decision of the nominalistic and conceptualistic controversy, so far as it touches psychology. We must decide in favor of the conceptualists, and affirm that the power to think things, qualities, relations, or whatever other elements there may be, isolated and abstracted from the total experience in which they appear, is the most indisputable function of our thought. [...] After abstractions, universals! The 'fringe,' which lets us believe in the one, lets us believe in the other too.

[...]

Why, from Plato and Aristotle, philosophers should have vied with each other in scorn of the knowledge of the particular and in adoration of that of the general, is hard to understand, seeing that [...] the things of worth are all concretes and singulars. The only value of universal characters is that they help us, by reasoning, to know new truths about individual things.

— William James, The Principles of Psychology (1890)

There are at least three ways in which a realist might try to answer James' challenge of explaining the reason why universal conceptions are more lofty than those of particulars: the moral–political answer, the mathematical–scientific answer, and the anti-paradoxical answer. Each has contemporary or near-contemporary advocates.

=== Weaver ===
The moral or political response is given by the conservative philosopher Richard M. Weaver in Ideas Have Consequences (1948), where he describes how the acceptance of "the fateful doctrine of nominalism" was "the crucial event in the history of Western culture; from this flowed those acts which issue now in modern decadence".

=== Quine ===
The noted American philosopher W. V. O. Quine addressed the problem of universals throughout his career. In his 1947 paper "On Universals", he writes that the problem of universals is chiefly to be understood as a question of ontology—concerning the existence (or lack thereof) of universals as entities—rather than as a linguistic matter, concerning only our naming of universals. He explains the Platonist position as motivated by a belief that our ability to form general conceptions is inexplicable unless universals exist outside of the mind; the nominalist, in contrast, finds that appeal to such entities is "empty verbalism, devoid of explanatory value." Quine himself does not propose to resolve this particular debate; what he does say, however, is that certain types of discourse (viz., propositions that quantify over universals, and which cannot be rephrased to use variables of quantification that refer only to concrete individuals) explicitly presuppose universals: nominalists must, therefore, give these up. Quine's approach is therefore something of an epistemological one—i.e., about what can be known—rather than a metaphysical one, i.e. about what is real.

=== Cocchiarella ===
Nino Cocchiarella put forward the idea that realism is the best response to certain logical paradoxes to which nominalism leads ("Nominalism and Conceptualism as Predicative Second Order Theories of Predication", Notre Dame Journal of Formal Logic, vol. 21 (1980)). It is noted that, in a sense, Cocchiarella has adopted Platonism for anti-Platonic reasons: Plato, as seen in the dialogue Parmenides, was willing to accept a certain amount of paradox to have his Forms; Cocchiarella adopts the forms to avoid paradox.

=== Armstrong ===
The Australian philosopher David Malet Armstrong has been one of the leading realists in the twentieth century, and has used a concept of universals to build a naturalistic and scientifically realist ontology. In both Universals and Scientific Realism (1978) and Universals: An Opinionated Introduction (1989), Armstrong describes the relative merits of a number of nominalist theories which appeal either to "natural classes" (a view he ascribes to Anthony Quinton), concepts, resemblance relations or predicates, and also discusses non-realist "trope" accounts (which he describes in the Universals and Scientific Realism volumes as "particularism"). He gives a number of reasons to reject all of these, but also dismisses a number of realist accounts.

=== Penrose ===
Roger Penrose contends that the foundations of mathematics can't be understood without the Platonic view that "mathematical truth is absolute, external and eternal, and not based on man-made criteria ... mathematical objects have a timeless existence of their own..."

== Indian philosophy ==
=== Nyāya-Vaiśeṣika (Realist position) ===
Indian philosophers raise the problem of universals in relation to semantics. Universals are postulated as referents for the meanings of general terms.

The Nyāya-Vaiśeṣika school conceives of universals as perceptible eternal entities, existing independently of our minds. Nyāya postulates the existence of universals based on our experience of a common characteristic among particulars. Thus, the meaning of a word is understood as a particular further characterized by a universal. For example, the meaning of the term 'cow' refers to a particular cow characterized by the universal of 'cowness'. Nyāya holds that although universals are apprehended differently from particulars, they are not separate, given their inherence in the particulars.

Not every term, however, corresponds to a universal. Udāyana puts forward six conditions for identifying genuine universals.

=== Mīmaṃsã (Realist position) ===
Like the Nyāya-Vaiśeṣika school, Mīmaṃsã characterizes universals as referents for words. The fundamental difference between Bhāṭṭa Mīmaṃsā's and Nyāya is that Bhāṭṭa Mīmaṃsa rejects the Nyāya understanding of the universals' relation of inherence to the particulars. The Hindu philosopher Kumārila Bhaṭṭa argues that if inherence is different from the terms of the relation, it would continuously require another common relation, and if the inherence is non-different, it would be superfluous.

=== Buddhist Nominalism ===
Buddhist ontology regards the world as consisting of momentary particulars and mentally constructed universals. In contrast to the realist schools of Indian philosophy, Buddhist logicians put forward a positive theory of nominalism, known as the apoha theory, which denies the existence of universals.

The apoha theory identifies particulars through double negation, not requiring for a general shared essence between terms. For instance, the term 'cow' can be understood as referring to every entity of its exclusion class 'non-cow'.

== Positions ==
There are many philosophical positions regarding universals.

1. Platonic realism (also called extreme realism or exaggerated realism) is the view that universals possess a real existence that depends neither upon mind nor upon their instantiation in particular objects. The theory of forms—wherein said forms are posited to not only exist independently of both mind and particular, but to in fact be the causal explanation behind the apparent shared properties or essential natures (e.g., that "tree-ness" in which all trees appear to partake) that motivate consideration of universals—is the prototypical exemplar of this approach. (I.e., in short: this view holds that universals are real entities that exist in-and-of themselves.)
2. Aristotelian realism (also called strong realism or moderate realism) is a partial rejection of extreme realism; this position takes a universal to be some quality or property found in a particular thing, which quality may also be predicated of many other things but which has no existence otherwise—none, that is, outside of those particulars in which it inheres. (I.e., in short: this view holds that universals are real entities, but that their existence is dependent upon the particulars that exemplify them.)
3. Anti-realism is the objection to both positions. Anti-realism is divided into two subcategories: (1) Nominalism, and (2) Conceptualism.

Taking "beauty" as an example, the following statements correspond, respectively, to each of the above positions:

- Beauty is a property that exists—perhaps abstractly (non-spatiotemporally), or as an ideal form—independently of any mind or description, and would so exist even were no beautiful objects extant.
- Beauty is a property that exists independently of any mind, but only when and where beautiful things exist.
- Beauty is a property constructed in the mind, and so exists only in descriptions of things; it is a sort of useful concept or tool of categorization, rather than an actual property-in-the-world.

=== Realism ===
Realist approaches posit some sort of mind-independent existence for universals. Two major forms of metaphysical realism are Platonic realism (universalia ante res, "universals before things"), and Aristotelian realism (universalia in rebus, "universals in things"). Platonic realism is the view that universals are real entities, existing independently of any particulars which may (or may not) exemplify them; Aristotelian realism, on the other hand, is the view that universals are real entities, but their existence is dependent on—they exist only within—the particulars that exemplify them.

Realists tend to argue that universals must be posited as distinct entities in order to account for various phenomena. For example, a common realist argument is that universals are required for certain general words to have meaning, and for the sentences in which they occur to be true or false. Take the sentence "Djivan Gasparyan is a musician", for instance: the realist may claim that this sentence is only meaningful, and only expresses a truth, because the term musician has a referent (i.e., musicianship); if the term does not refer—corresponds to no actual, distinct quality—how are we to understand such sentences?

Similarly, the realist may argue that it is in virtue of such universal qualities (e.g. musicianship, wisdom, redness, and so on) that our experiences of concepts such as similarity and commonality may be explained: absent distinct properties that are shared by—but separate from—the individuals that appear to exemplify them, how are we to understand a sentence such as "both of these apples are red"; how is it that one and the same quality (viz., redness, in this case) may be predicated of multiple individuals?

=== Nominalism ===
Nominalists assert that only individuals or particulars exist and deny that universals are real (i.e. that they exist as entities or beings; universalia post res). The term "nominalism" comes from the Latin nomen ("name"). Four major forms of nominalism are predicate nominalism, resemblance nominalism, trope nominalism, and conceptualism. One with a nominalist view claims that we predicate the same property of/to multiple entities, but argues that the entities only share a name and do not have a real quality in common.

Nominalists often argue this view by claiming that nominalism can account for all the relevant phenomena, and therefore—by Occam's razor, and its principle of simplicity—nominalism is preferable, since it posits fewer entities. Different variants and versions of nominalism have been endorsed or defended by many, including Chrysippus, (Note: "[Stoics] have often been presented as the first nominalists, rejecting the existence of universal concepts altogether. ... For Chrysippus there are no universal entities, whether they be conceived as substantial Platonic Forms or in some other manner.") Ibn Taymiyyah, William of Ockham, Ibn Khaldun, Rudolf Carnap, Nelson Goodman, David Lewis, H. H. Price, and D. C. Williams.

=== Conceptualism ===
Conceptualism is a position that is—in a sense—part of the way between realism and nominalism, though it is usually considered to have more in common with the latter. Conceptualists believe that universals do exist, but only as concepts within the mind. Conceptualists argue that these concepts of universals are not mere "inventions but are reflections of similarities among particular things themselves." For example, the concept of "man" ultimately reflects a similarity between Socrates and Kant.

== See also ==
- Abstract and concrete
- Bundle theory
- Constructor theory
- Non-physical entity, an object that exists outside physical reality
- Object (philosophy)
- Qualia
- Philosophical realism
- Reification (fallacy), a fallacy of ambiguity when an abstraction is treated as if it were a physical entity
- Self
- Similarity (philosophy)
- Transcendental nominalism
- Tianxia
- Ubuntu philosophy
- Fallacy of composition
