= Abstract and concrete =

Metaphysics concept covering the divide between two types of entities

In philosophy, a fundamental distinction exists between abstract and concrete entities. While there is no universally accepted definition, common examples illustrate the difference: numbers, sets, and ideas are typically classified as abstract objects, whereas plants, dogs, and planets are considered concrete objects.

Philosophers have proposed several criteria to define this distinction:

1. Spatiotemporal existence – Abstract objects exist outside space-time, while concrete objects exist within space-time.
2. Causal influence – Concrete objects can cause and be affected by other entities (e.g., a rock breaking a window), whereas abstract objects (e.g., the number 2) lack causal powers and do not cause anything to happen in the physical world.
3. Metaphysical relation – In metaphysics, concrete objects are specific, individual things (particulars), while abstract objects represent general concepts or categories (universals).
4. Ontological domain – Concrete objects belong to the physical realm (or both the physical and mental realms), whereas abstract objects belong to neither.

Another view is that it is the distinction between contingent existence versus necessary existence; however, philosophers differ on which type of existence here defines abstractness, as opposed to concreteness. Despite this diversity of views, there is broad agreement concerning most objects as to whether they are abstract or concrete, such that most interpretations agree, for example, that rocks are concrete objects while numbers are abstract objects.

Abstract objects are most commonly used in philosophy, particularly metaphysics and semantics. They are sometimes called abstracta in contrast to concreta. The term abstract object is said to have been coined by Willard Van Orman Quine. Abstract object theory is a discipline that studies the nature and role of abstract objects. It holds that properties can be related to objects in two ways: through exemplification and through encoding. Concrete objects exemplify their properties while abstract objects merely encode them. This approach is also known as the dual copula strategy.

== In philosophy ==
The type–token distinction identifies physical objects that are tokens of a particular type of thing. The "type" of which it is a part is in itself an abstract object. The abstract–concrete distinction is often introduced and initially understood in terms of paradigmatic examples of objects of each kind:

Examples of abstract and concrete objects
Abstract	Concrete
Tennis	A tennis match
Redness	Red light reflected off of an apple and hitting one's eyes
Five	Five cars
Justice	A just action
Humanity (the property of being human)	Human population (the set of all humans)

Abstract objects have often garnered the interest of philosophers because they raise problems for popular theories. In ontology, abstract objects are considered problematic for physicalism and some forms of naturalism. Historically, the most important ontological dispute about abstract objects has been the problem of universals. In epistemology, abstract objects are considered problematic for empiricism, as under empiricism their existence cannot be recognized. It is hard to say how they can affect our sensory experiences, and yet we seem to agree on a wide range of claims about them. In philosophy of religion, the existence of abstract objects is sometimes considered a problem for divine aseity, which, for example, prompted the Christian philosopher William Lane Craig to argue against uncreated abstract objects. Other Christian philosophers, such as Peter van Inwagen, have conversely argued for their existence, seeing no conflict between them and theism.

Some, such as Ernst Mally, Edward Zalta and arguably, Plato in his Theory of Forms, have held that abstract objects constitute the defining subject matter of metaphysics or philosophical inquiry more broadly. To the extent that philosophy is independent of empirical research, and to the extent that empirical questions do not inform questions about abstracta, philosophy would seem especially suited to answering these latter questions.

In modern philosophy, the distinction between abstract and concrete was explored by Immanuel Kant and G. W. F. Hegel.

Gottlob Frege said that abstract objects, such as propositions, were members of a third realm, different from the external world or from internal consciousness. (See Popper's three worlds.)

=== Abstract objects and causality ===
Another popular proposal for drawing the abstract–concrete distinction contends that an object is abstract if it lacks causal power. A causal power has the ability to affect something causally. Thus, the empty set is abstract because it cannot act on other objects. One problem with this view is that it is not clear exactly what it is to have causal power. For a more detailed exploration of the abstract–concrete distinction, see the relevant Stanford Encyclopedia of Philosophy article.

=== Quasi-abstract entities ===
In the 2010s, there was some philosophical interest in the development of a third category of objects known as the quasi-abstract. Quasi-abstract objects have drawn particular attention in the area of social ontology and documentality. Some argue that an over-adherence to the platonist duality of the concrete and the abstract has led to a large category of social objects having been overlooked or rejected as nonexistent because they exhibit characteristics that the traditional duality between concrete and abstract regards as incompatible. Specifically, the ability to have temporal location, but not spatial location, and have causal agency (if only by acting through representatives). These characteristics are exhibited by a number of social objects, including states of the international legal system.

== In psychology ==
Jean Piaget uses the terms "concrete" and "formal" to describe two different types of learning. Concrete thinking involves facts and descriptions about everyday, tangible objects, while abstract (formal operational) thinking involves a mental process.

Abstract idea	Concrete idea
Dense things sink.	It will sink if its density is greater than the density of the fluid.
You breathe in oxygen and breathe out carbon dioxide.	Gas exchange takes place between the air in the alveoli and the blood.
Plants get water through their roots.	Water diffuses through the cell membrane of the root hair cells.

== See also ==
- A priori and a posteriori
- Abstract structure
  - Mathematical object
- Analytic–synthetic distinction
- Concept and object
- Conceptual framework
- Emic and etic
- Incorporeality
- Nominalism
- Non-physical entity
- Observation
- Philosophy of mathematics
- Platonic realm

== Sources ==
- Zalta, Edward N. (1983). Abstract Objects: An Introduction to Axiomatic Metaphysics. Synthese Library. Vol. 160. Dordrecht, Netherlands: D. Reidel Publishing Company. ISBN 978-90-277-1474-9.
