= Type–token distinction =

Distinguishing objects and classes of objects

Although this flock is made of the same type of bird, each individual bird is a different token.

The type–token distinction is the difference between a type of objects (analogous to a class) and the individual tokens of that type (analogous to instances). Since each type may be instantiated by multiple tokens, there are generally more tokens than types of an object.

For example, the sentence "A rose is a rose is a rose" contains three word types: three word tokens of the type a, two word tokens of the type is, and three word tokens of the type rose. The distinction is important in disciplines such as logic, linguistics, metalogic, typography, and computer programming.

== Overview ==
The type–token distinction separates types (abstract descriptive concepts) from tokens (objects that instantiate concepts). For example, in the sentence "the bicycle is becoming more popular" the word bicycle represents the abstract concept of bicycles and this abstract concept is a type, whereas in the sentence "the bicycle is in the garage", it represents a particular object and this particular object is a token. Similarly, the word type 'letter' uses only four letter types: L, E, T and R. Nevertheless, it uses both E and T twice. One can say that the word type 'letter' has six letter tokens, with two tokens each of the letter types E and T. Whenever a word type is inscribed, the number of letter tokens created equals the number of letter occurrences in the word type.

Some logicians consider a word type to be the class of its tokens. Other logicians counter that the word type has a permanence and constancy not found in the class of its tokens. The type remains the same while the class of its tokens is continually gaining new members and losing old ones.

== Typography ==
In typography, the type–token distinction is used to determine the presence of a text printed by movable type:

The defining criteria which a typographic print has to fulfill is that of the type identity of the various letter forms which make up the printed text. In other words: each letter form which appears in the text has to be shown as a particular instance ("token") of one and the same type which contains a reverse image of the printed letter.

== Charles Sanders Peirce ==
The distinctions between using words as types or tokens were first made by American logician and philosopher Charles Sanders Peirce in 1906 using terminology that he established. Peirce's type–token distinction applies to words, sentences, paragraphs and so on: to anything in a universe of discourse of character-string theory, or concatenation theory.

Peirce's original words are the following:

A common mode of estimating the amount of matter in a ... printed book is to count the number of words. There will ordinarily be about twenty 'thes' on a page, and, of course, they count as twenty words. In another sense of the word 'word,' however, there is but one word 'the' in the English language; and it is impossible that this word should lie visibly on a page, or be heard in any voice .... Such a ... Form, I propose to term a Type. A Single ... Object ... such as this or that word on a single line of a single page of a single copy of a book, I will venture to call a Token. .... In order that a Type may be used, it has to be embodied in a Token which shall be a sign of the Type, and thereby of the object the Type signifies.

— Peirce 1906, also Ogden and Richards, 1923, 280-1.

== See also ==
- Class (philosophy) – Group of things derived from extensional or intensional definition
- Formalism (philosophy) – Concept of focusing on form over concept
- Haecceity – Term from medieval scholastic philosophy
- Hypernymy and hyponymy – Semantic relations involving the type-of property
- Identity (philosophy) – Relation each thing bears to itself alone
- Identity of indiscernibles – Impossibility for separate objects to have all their properties in common
- Is-a – Subsumption relationship between abstractions
- Map–territory relation – Relationship between an object and a representation of that object
- Mental model – Mental representation of the external world
- Problem of universals § Peirce
- Platonic ideal – Philosophical theory attributed to Plato
- Use–mention distinction – Distinction between using a word and mentioning it
- Type theory – Mathematical theory of data types
- Type physicalism – Theory in the philosophy of mind
