= Heloise =

French nun, philosopher, writer, scholar, and abbess (1101–1164)

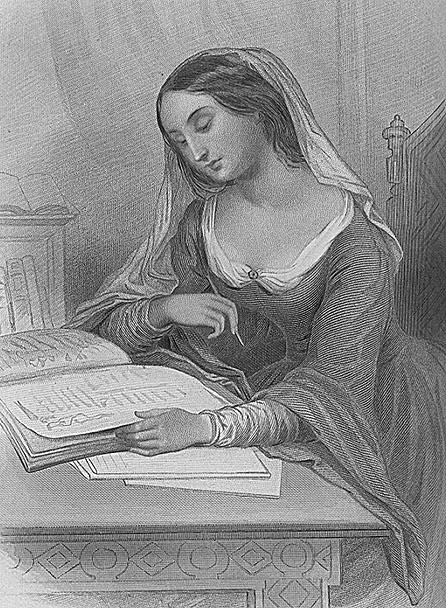
- Born: c. 1101; Near Paris, France
- Died: 21 April 1163 (aged 62–63); Near Troyes, France
- Other name: Héloïse (modern spelling)

Education
- Academic advisor: Peter Abelard

Philosophical work
- Era: Medieval philosophy
- Region: Western philosophy
- School: Scholasticism
- Main interests: Ethics, philosophy of friendship, love, and sex, philosophy of language, theology, early Catholic feminism
- Notable works: Problemata Heloissae

Héloïse (French: [elɔ.iz]; c. 1101 – 16 May 1164), variously Héloïse d'Argenteuil or Héloïse du Paraclet, was a French nun, philosopher, writer, scholar, and abbess.

Héloïse was a renowned "woman of letters" and philosopher of love and friendship, as well as an eventual high ranking abbess in the Catholic Church. She achieved approximately the level and political power of a bishop in 1147 when she was granted the rank of prelate nullius.

She is famous in history and popular culture for her love affair and correspondence with the leading medieval logician and theologian Peter Abelard, who became her colleague, collaborator, and husband. She is known for exerting critical intellectual influence upon his work and posing many challenging questions to him such as those in the Problemata Heloissae.

Her surviving letters are considered a foundation of French and European literature and primary inspiration for the practice of courtly love. Her erudite and sometimes erotically charged correspondence is the Latin basis for the bildungsroman genre and serves alongside Abelard's Historia Calamitatum as a model of the classical epistolary genre. Her influence extends on later writers such as Chrétien de Troyes, Geoffrey Chaucer, Madame de Lafayette, Thomas Aquinas, Choderlos de Laclos, Voltaire, Rousseau, Simone Weil, and Dominique Aury.

She is an important figure in the establishment of women's representation in scholarship and is known for her controversial portrayals of gender and marriage which influenced the development of modern feminism.

== Philosophy and legacy ==
Héloïse heavily influenced Abelard's ethics, theology, and philosophy of love. As a scholar of Cicero following in his tradition, Heloise writes of pure friendship and pure unselfish love. Her letters critically develop an ethical philosophy in which intent is centrally placed as critical for determining the moral correctness or "sin" of an action. She claims: "For it is not the deed itself but the intention of the doer that makes the sin. Equity weighs not what is done, but the spirit in which it is done." This perspective influenced Abelard's intention-centered ethics described in his later work Etica (Scito Te Ipsum) (c. 1140) and thus serves as a foundation to the development of the deontological ethics of intentionalist ethics in medieval philosophy prior to Aquinas.

She describes her love as "innocent" yet paradoxically "guilty" of having caused a punishment (Abelard's castration). She refuses to repent of her so-called sins, insisting that God had punished her only after she was married and had already moved away from so-called "sin". Her writings emphasize intent as the key to identifying whether an action is sinful/wrong, while insisting that she has always had good intent.

Héloïse wrote critically of marriage conducted without love, comparing it to contractual prostitution, and describing it as different from "pure love" and devotional friendship such as that she shared with Peter Abelard. In her first letter, she writes that she "preferred love to wedlock, freedom to a bond." She also states, "Assuredly, whomsoever this concupiscence leads into marriage deserves payment rather than affection; for it is evident that she goes after his wealth and not the man, and is willing to prostitute herself, if she can, to a richer." Peter Abelard himself reproduces her arguments (citing Heloise) in Historia Calamitatum. She also writes critically of childbearing, child care, and mutually exclusive aspects of scholarship and parenthood. Heloise preferred what she perceived as the relative honesty of sex work to what she perceived as the hypocrisy of gold-digging marriage: "If the name of wife seems holier and more impressive, to my ears the name of mistress always sounded sweeter or, if you are not ashamed of it, the name of concubine or whore...God is my witness, if Augustus, who ruled over the whole earth, should have thought me worthy of the honor of marriage and made me ruler of all the world forever, it would have seemed sweeter and more honorable to me to be called your mistress than his empress" (The Latin word she chose now rendered as "whore", scortum (from "scrotum") is curiously in medieval usage a term for male prostitute or "rent boy".)

In her later letters, Heloise develops with her husband Abelard an approach for women's religious management and female scholarship, insisting that a convent for women be run with rules specifically interpreted for women's needs.

Heloise is a significant forerunner of contemporary feminist scholars as one of the first feminine scholars, and the first medieval female scholar, to discuss marriage, child-bearing, and sex work in a critical way.

== Life and historical events ==
=== Background and education ===
Héloïse is variously spelled Helöise, Héloyse, Hélose, Heloisa, Helouisa, Eloise, and Aloysia, among other variations. Her first name is derived from Proto-Germanic Hailawidis, "holy wood", or possibly a feminization of St. Eloi. Her family origin and original surname are unknown, but her last name is often rendered as "D'Argenteuil" based on her childhood home or sometimes "Du Paraclet" based on her mid-life appointment as abbess at the convent of the Paraclete near Troyes, France.

Early in life, Héloïse was recognized as a leading scholar of Latin, Greek and Hebrew hailing from the convent of Argenteuil just outside Paris, where she was educated by nuns until adolescence. She was already renowned for her knowledge of language and writing when she arrived in Paris as a young woman, and had developed a reputation for intelligence and insight. Abelard writes that she was nominatissima, "most renowned" for her gift in reading and writing. She wrote poems, plays and hymns, some of which have been lost.

Her family background is largely unknown. She was the ward of her maternal uncle (avunculus) Canon Fulbert of Notre Dame and the daughter of a woman named Hersinde, who is sometimes speculated to have been Hersint of Champagne (Lady of Montsoreau and founder of the Fontevraud Abbey) or possibly a lesser known nun called Hersinde at the convent of St. Eloi (from which the name "Heloise" would have been taken).

In her letters she implies she is of a lower social standing than Peter Abelard, who was originally from the lower nobility, though he had rejected knighthood to be a philosopher. Speculation that her mother was Hersinde of Champagne/Fontrevaud and her father Gilbert Garlande conflicts with Heloise's depiction of herself as lower class than Abelard. Hersinde of Champagne was of lower nobility, and the Garlandes were from a higher social echelon than Abelard and served as his patrons. The Hersinde of Champagne theory is further complicated by the fact that Hersinde of Champagne died in 1114 between the ages of 54 and 80, implying that she would have had to have given birth to Heloise between the ages of 35 and 50.

What is known for sure is that her Uncle Fulbert, a canon of Notre Dame collected her to Notre Dame from her childhood home in Argenteuil. By her mid teens to early twenties, she was renowned throughout France for her scholarship. While her birth year is disputed, she is traditionally held to be about 15 to 17 when meeting Abelard. By the time she became his student, she was already of high repute herself. As a poetic and highly literate prodigy of female sex familiar with multiple languages, she attracted much attention, including the notice of Peter the Venerable of Cluny, who notes that he became aware of her acclaim when he and she were both young. She soon attracted the romantic interest of celebrity scholar Peter Abelard.

Heloise is said to have gained knowledge in medicine or folk medicine from either Abelard or his kinswoman Denise and gained reputation as a physician in her role as abbess of Paraclete.

=== Meeting Abelard ===
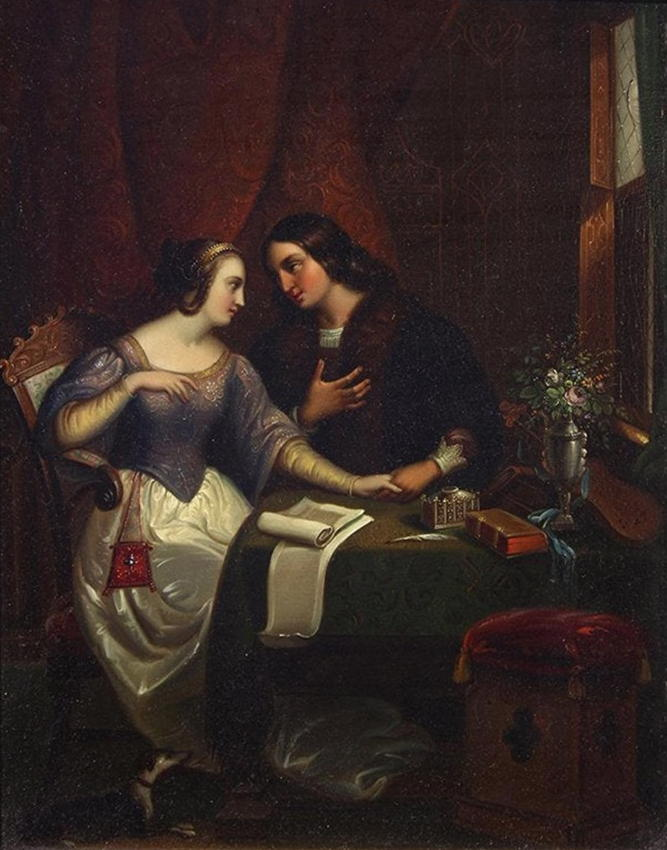
Jean-Baptiste Goyet, Héloïse et Abailard, oil on copper, c. 1829

In his autobiographical piece and public letter Historia Calamitatum (c. 1132?), Abelard tells the story of his relationship with Héloïse, whom he met in 1115, when he taught in the Paris schools of Notre Dame. Abelard describes their relationship as beginning with a premeditated seduction, but Heloise contests this perspective adamantly in her replies. (It is sometimes speculated that Abelard may have presented the relationship as fully of his responsibility in order to justify his later punishment and withdrawal to religion and/or in order to spare Heloise's reputation as an abbess and woman of God.) Conversely, in her early love letters, Heloise depicts herself as the initiator, having chosen Abelard as her friend and lover among the thousands of men in Notre Dame.

In his letters, Abelard praises Heloise as extremely intelligent and just passably pretty, drawing attention to her academic status rather than framing her as a sex object: "She is not bad in the face, but her copious writings are second to none." He emphasizes that he sought her out specifically due to her literacy and learning, which was unheard of in most un-cloistered women of his era.

It is unclear how old Héloïse was at the time they became acquainted. During the twelfth century in France, the typical age at which a young person would begin attending university was between the ages of 12 and 15. As a young female, Heloise would have been forbidden from fraternizing with the male students or officially attending university at Notre Dame. With university education offered only to males, and convent education at this age reserved only for nuns, this age would have been a natural time for her uncle Fulbert to arrange for special instruction. Heloise is described by Abelard as an adolescentula (young girl). Based on this description, she is typically assumed to be between fifteen and seventeen years old upon meeting him and thus born in 1100–01. There is a tradition that she died at the same age as did Abelard (63) in 1163 or 1164. The term adolescent, however, is vague, and no primary source of her year of birth has been located. Recently, as part of a contemporary investigation into Heloise's identity and prominence, Constant Mews has suggested that she may have been so old as her early twenties (and thus born around 1090) when she met Abelard. The main support for his opinion, however, is a debatable interpretation of a letter of Peter the Venerable (born 1092) in which he writes to Héloïse that he remembers that she was famous when he was still a young man. Constant Mews assumes he must have been talking about an older woman given his respect for her, but this is speculation. It is just as likely that a female adolescent prodigy amongst male university students in Paris could have attracted great renown and (especially retrospective) praise. It is at least clear that she had gained this renown and some level of respect before Abelard came onto the scene.

=== Romantic liaison ===
In lieu of university studies, Canon Fulbert arranged for Heloise's private tutoring with Peter Abelard, who was then a leading philosopher in Western Europe and the most popular secular canon scholar (professor) of Notre Dame. A deal was made wherein Abelard would teach Heloise in exchange for lodgings.

Abelard tells of their subsequent illicit relationship, which they continued until Héloïse became pregnant. Abelard moved Héloïse away from Fulbert and sent her to his own sister, Denise, in Brittany, where Héloïse gave birth to a boy. She named her son Astrolabe after the navigational device that is used to determine a position on Earth by charting the position of the stars.

Abelard agreed to marry Héloïse to appease Fulbert, although on the condition that the marriage should be kept secret so as not to damage Abelard's career. Heloise insisted on a secret marriage due to her fears of marriage injuring Abelard's career. Likely, Abelard had recently joined Religious Orders (something on which scholarly opinion is divided), and given that the church was beginning to forbid marriage to priests and the higher orders of clergy (to the point of a papal order re-affirming this idea in 1123), public marriage would have been a potential bar to Abelard's advancement in the church. Héloïse was initially reluctant to agree to any marriage, but was eventually persuaded by Abelard. Héloïse returned from Brittany, and the couple was secretly married in Paris. As part of the bargain, she continued to live in her uncle's house.

=== Tragic turn of events ===
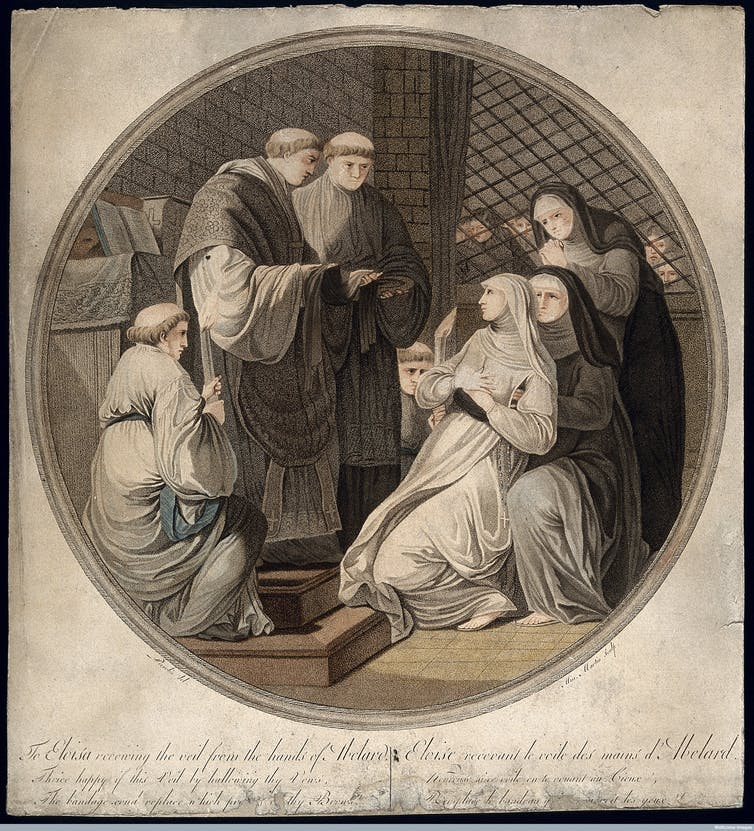
Heloise takes the habit at Argenteuil.

Fulbert immediately went back on his word and began to spread the news of the marriage. Héloïse attempted to deny this, arousing his wrath and abuse. Abelard rescued her by sending her to the convent at Argenteuil, where she had been brought up. Héloïse dressed as a nun and shared the life of the nuns, though she was not veiled. Fulbert, infuriated that Heloise had been taken from his house and possibly believing that Abelard had disposed of her at Argenteuil in order to be rid of her, arranged for a band of men to break into Abelard's room one night and castrate him. In legal retribution for this vigilante attack, members of the band were punished, and Fulbert, scorned by the public, took temporary leave of his canon duties (he does not appear again in the Paris cartularies for several years).

After castration, filled with shame at his situation, Abelard became a monk in the Abbey of St Denis in Paris. At the convent in Argenteuil, Héloïse took the veil. She quoted dramatically from Cornelia's speech in Lucan's Pharsalia: "Why did I marry you and bring about your fall? Now...see me gladly pay."

It is commonly portrayed that Abelard forced Heloise into the convent due to jealousy. Yet, as her husband was entering the monastery, she had few other options at the time, beyond perhaps returning to the care of her betrayer Fulbert, leaving Paris again to stay with Abelard's family in rural Brittany outside Nantes, or divorcing and remarrying (most likely to a non-intellectual, as canon scholars were increasingly expected to be celibate). Entering religious orders was a common career shift or retirement option in twelfth century France. Her appointment as a nun, then prioress, and then abbess was her only opportunity for an academic career as a woman in 12th century France, her only hope to maintain cultural influence, and her only opportunity to stay in touch with or benefit Abelard. Examined in a societal context, her decision to follow Abelard into religion upon his direction, despite an initial lack of vocation, is less shocking.

=== Astrolabe, son of Abelard and Heloise ===
Shortly after the birth of their child, Astrolabe, Heloise and Abelard were both cloistered. Their son was thus brought up by Abelard's sister (soror), Denise, at Abelard's childhood home in Le Pallet. His name derives from the astrolabe, a Persian astronomical instrument said to elegantly model the universe and which was popularized in France by Adelard. He is mentioned in Abelard's poem to his son, the Carmen Astralabium, and by Abelard's protector, Peter the Venerable of Cluny, who wrote to Héloise: "I will gladly do my best to obtain a prebend in one of the great churches for your Astrolabe, who is also ours for your sake".

'Petrus Astralabius' is recorded at the Cathedral of Nantes in 1150, and the same name appears again later at the Cistercian abbey at Hauterive in what is now Switzerland. Given the extreme eccentricity of the name, it is almost certain these references refer to the same person. Astrolabe is recorded as dying in the Paraclete necrology on 29 or 30 October, year unknown, appearing as "Petrus Astralabius magistri nostri Petri filius" (Peter Astrolabe, son of our magister [master] Peter).

=== Later life ===
Heloise rose in the church, first achieving the level of prioress of Argenteuil. At the disbandment of Argenteuil and seizure by the monks of St Dennis under Abbot Suger, Heloise was transferred to the Paraclete, where Abelard had stationed himself during a period of hermitage. (He had dedicated his chapel to the Paraclete, the holy spirit, because he "had come there as a fugitive and, in the depths of my despair, was granted some comfort by the grace of God".) They now rededicated it as a convent, and Abelard moved on to St. Gildas in Brittany where he became abbot. Heloise became prioress and then abbess of the Paraclete, finally achieving the level of prelate nullius (roughly equivalent to bishop). Her properties and daughter-houses (including the convents of Sainte-Madeleine-de-Traîne (c. 1142), La Pommeray (c. 1147-51?), Laval (ca. 1153), Noëfort (before 1157), Sainte-Flavit (before 1157), Boran / Sainte-Martin-aux-Nonnettes (by 1163)) extended across France, and she was known as a formidable businesswoman.

== Letters ==
=== Exchange with Abelard ===
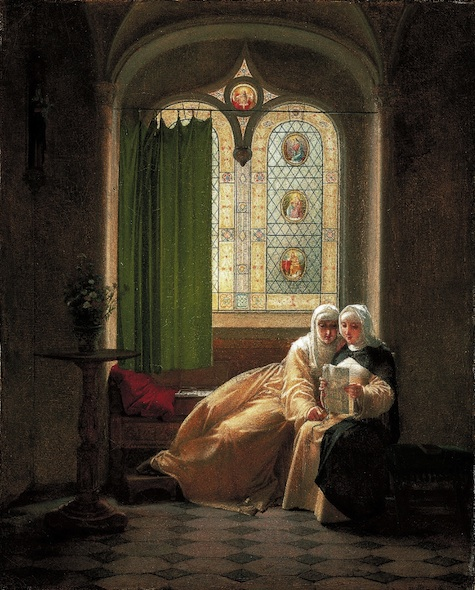
Heloise at the Abbey of the Paraclete by Jean-Baptiste Mallet

The primary correspondence existing today consists of seven letters (numbered Epistolae 2–8 in Latin volumes, since the Historia Calamitatum precedes them as Epistola 1). Four of the letters (Epistolae 2–5) are known as the 'Personal Letters', and contain personal correspondence. The remaining three (Epistolae 6–8) are known as the 'Letters of Direction'. An earlier set of 113 letters discovered much more recently (in the early 1970s) is vouched to also belong to Abelard and Heloise by historian and Abelard scholar Constant Mews.

Correspondence began between the two former lovers after the events described in the last section. Héloïse responded, both on the behalf of the Paraclete and herself. In letters which followed, Héloïse expressed dismay at problems that Abelard faced, but scolded him for years of silence following the attack, since Abelard was still wed to Héloïse.

Thus began a correspondence both passionate and erudite. Héloïse encouraged Abelard in his philosophical work, and he dedicated his profession of faith to her. He then recommended her to turn her attention toward Jesus Christ who is the source of true love, and to consecrate herself fully from then on to her religious vocation.

At this point the tenor of the letters changes. In the 'Letters of Direction', Héloïse writes the fifth letter, declaring that she will no longer write of the hurt that Abelard has caused her. The sixth is a long letter by Abelard in response to Héloïse's first question in the fifth letter about the origin of nuns. In the long final, seventh letter, Abelard provides a rule for the nuns at the Oratory of the Paraclete, again as requested by Héloïse at the outset of the fifth letter.

The Problemata Heloissae (Héloïse's Problems) is a letter from Héloïse to Abelard containing 42 questions about difficult passages in scripture, interspersed with Abelard's answers to the questions, probably written at the time when she was abbess at the Paraclete.

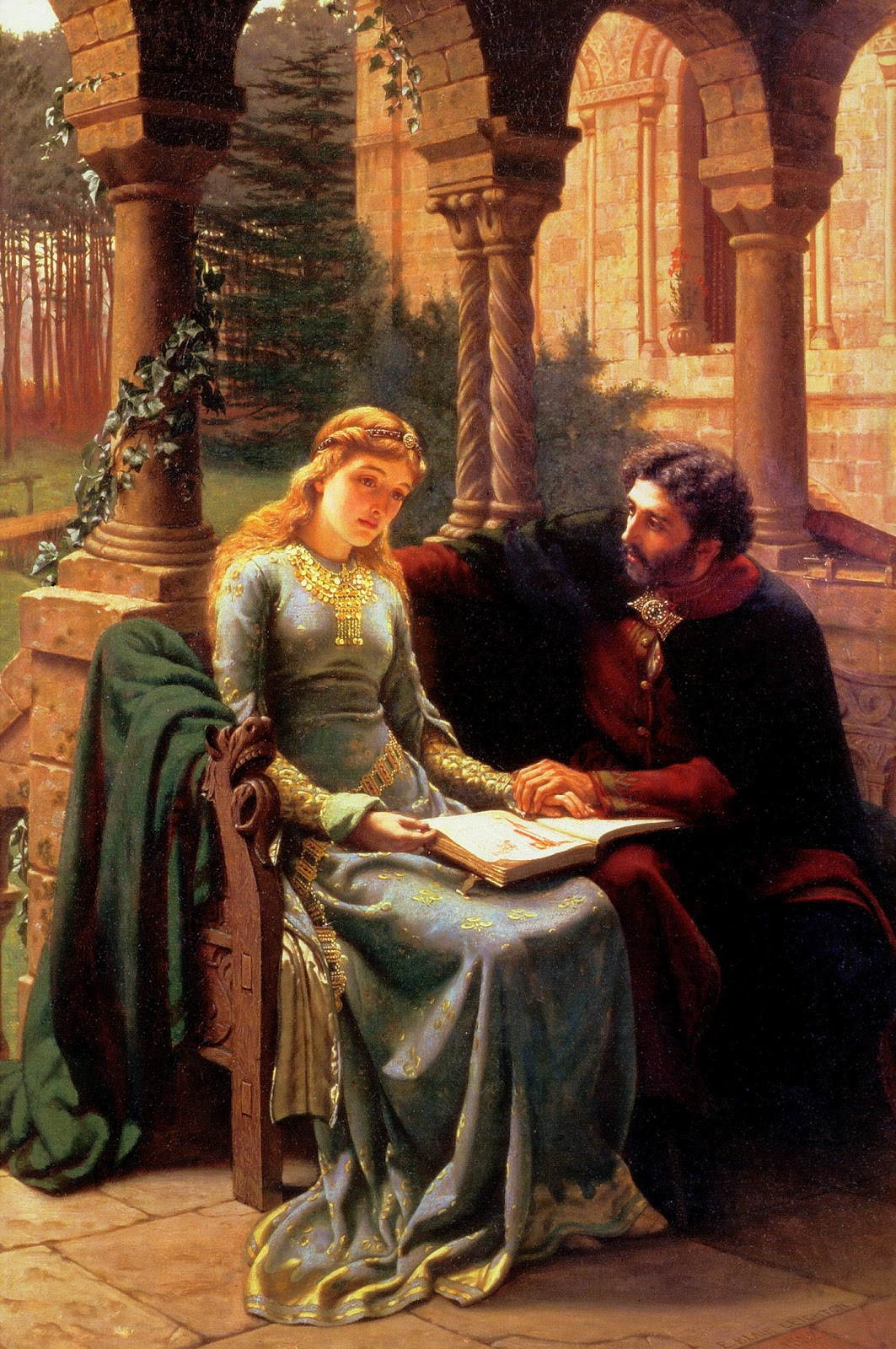
Abelard and his pupil Heloise by Edmund Leighton, 1882

=== Epistolae Duorum Amantium ===
In 1974, Ewald Könsgen first suggested that an anonymous series of letters, the Epistolae Duorum Amantium, were in fact written by Héloïse and Abelard during their initial romance (and, thus, before the later and more broadly known series of letters). In the 1990s, Constant Mews and others began making similar arguments. If they are genuine, these letters would represent a significant expansion to the corpus of surviving writing by Héloïse, and thus open several new directions for further scholarship.

However, because the second set of letters is anonymous, and attribution "is of necessity based on circumstantial rather than on absolute evidence," their authorship is still a subject of debate and discussion. The majority of scholars has come to reject the idea that this second set of 113 anonymous letters was written by Heloise and Abelard, although the same scholars usually hold the first set of 15 letters to be authentic.

== Influence on literature ==
Héloïse is accorded an important place in French literary history and in the development of feminist representation. While few of her letters survive, those that do have been considered a foundational "monument" of French literature from the late thirteenth century onwards. Her correspondence, more erudite than it is erotic, is the Latin basis for the Bildungsroman and a model of the classical epistolary genre, and which influenced writers as diverse as Chretien de Troyes, Madame de Lafayette, Choderlos de Laclos, Rousseau and Dominique Aury.

=== Early development of the myth ===
- Jean de Meun, the first translator of Héloïse's work, is also the first person, in around 1290, to quote, in the Roman de la Rose (verses 8729 to 8802), the myth of Héloïse and Abelard, which must have meant that her work was sufficiently popular in order for the readership to understand the allusion.
- In around 1337, Petrarch acquired a copy of the Correspondence, which already included the Historia Calamitatum (translated by Jean de Meun). Petrarch added many notes to the manuscript before starting to compose in the following year a Chansonnier dedicated to Laure de Sade.
- The Breton lament song (Gwerz) titled Loiza ac Abalard sings of the ancient druidess picking 'golden grass' with the features of a sorceress-alchemist known as Héloïse. This spread a popular tradition, perhaps originating in Rhuys, Brittany, and going as far as Naples. This text and its later tradition associated magic with rationalism, which remained an important component of Abelardian theology as it was perceived until the twentieth century.
- In 1583, the Abbey of Paraclet, heavily damaged during the Wars of Religion, was deserted by its monastic residents who disagreed with the Huguenot sympathies of their mother superior. The Abbess Marie de la Rochefoucauld, named by Louis XIII to the position in 1599 in spite of opposition from Pope Clement VIII, set to work on restoring the prestige of the establishment and organised the cult of Héloïse and Abelard.

=== Early modern period ===
- Following a first Latin edition, that of Duchesne dated to 1616, the Comte de Bussy Rabutin, as part of his epistolary correspondence with his cousin the marquise de Sévigné, sent her a very partial and unfaithful translation on 12 April 1687, a text which would be included in the posthumous collected works of the writer.
- Alexander Pope, inspired by the English translation that the poet John Hughes made using the translation by Bussy Rabutin, brought the myth back into fashion when he published in 1717 the famous tragic poem Eloisa to Abelard, which was intended as a pastiche, but does not relate to the authentic letters. The original text was neglected and only the characters and the plot were used.
- Twenty years later, Pierre-François Godard produced a French verse version of Bussy Rabutin's text.
- Jean-Jacques Rousseau drew on the reinvented figure in order to write Julie ou la Nouvelle Héloïse, which his editor published in 1761 under the title Lettres des deux amans.
- In 1763, Charles-Pierre Colardeau loosely translated the version of the story imagined by Pope, which depicted Héloïse as a recluse writing to Abelard, and spread the sentimental version of the legend over the continent.
- An edition designed by André-Charles Cailleau and produced by the heiress of André Duchesne further spread amongst reading audiences a collection of these re-imaginings of the figure of Héloïse.

=== Romantic period ===
- At the very beginning of the romantic period, in 1807, a neo-Gothic monument was constructed for Héloïse and Abelard and was transferred to the Cimetière de l'Est in Paris in 1817.
- In 1836, A. Creuzé de Lesser, the former Préfet of Montpellier, provided a translation of 'LI poèmes de la vie et des malheurs d'Eloïse et Aballard' which was published alongside his translation of the 'Romances du Cid'
- In 1836, the scholar Victor Cousin focused on Héloïse as part of his studies on Abelard.
- In 1839, François Guizot, the former minister for public education, published the posthumous essay of his first wife, Pauline de Meulan, as a preface to the hugely-popular first edition of the Lettres d'Abailard et d'Héloïse, which were transposed rather than translated into French and in two volumes illustrated by Jean Gigoux.
- In the same year, the colibri Héloïse (Atthis heloisa) is dedicated to her by the ornithologists René Primevère Lesson and Adolphe Delattre.
- In 1845, Jean-Pierre Vibert created a species of rose named after Héloïse.
- Following the romantic tradition, Lamartine published in 1859 a version of Héloïse et Abélard.
- In 1859, Wilkie Collins published the hugely popular novel The Woman in White, which relies on a similar story involving a male tutor ending up in love with his female pupil, told in an epistolary format.
- Charles de Rémusat, a biographer of Abelard, wrote in 1877 a play based on the story of the medieval figures.

== Disputed issues ==
=== Attribution of works ===
The authorship of the writings connected with Héloïse has been a subject of scholarly disagreement for much of their history.

The most well-established documents, and correspondingly those whose authenticity has been disputed the longest, are the series of letters that begin with Abelard's Historia Calamitatum (counted as letter 1) and encompass four "personal letters" (numbered 2–5) and "letters of direction" (numbers 6–8) and which include the notable Problemata Heloissae. Most scholars today accept these works as having been written by Héloïse and Abelard themselves. John Benton is the most prominent modern skeptic of these documents. Etienne Gilson, Peter Dronke, and Constant Mews maintain the mainstream view that the letters are genuine, arguing that the skeptical viewpoint is fueled in large part by its advocates' pre-conceived notions.

=== Heloise, Abelard, and sexual consent ===
The great majority of academic scholars and popular writers have interpreted the story of Héloïse's relationship with Abelard as a consensual and tragic romance. However, much controversy has been generated by a disturbing quote from Abelard in the fifth letter in which he implies that sexual relations with Heloise were, at least at some points, not consensual. While attempting to dissuade Heloise from her romantic memories and encourage her to fully embrace religion, he writes: "When you objected to [sex] yourself and resisted with all your might, and tried to dissuade me from it, I frequently forced your consent (for after all you were the weaker) by threats and blows." Importantly, this passage runs in stark contrast to Heloise's depiction of their relationship, in which she speaks of "desiring" and "choosing" him, enjoying their sexual encounters, and going so far as to describe herself as having chosen herself to pursue him amongst the "thousands" of men in Notre Dame. Nevertheless, working solely from the sentence in Abelard's fifth letter, Mary Ellen Waithe argued in 1989 that Héloïse was strongly opposed to a sexual relationship, thus presenting her as a victim and depicting an Abelard who sexually harassed, abused, and raped his student.

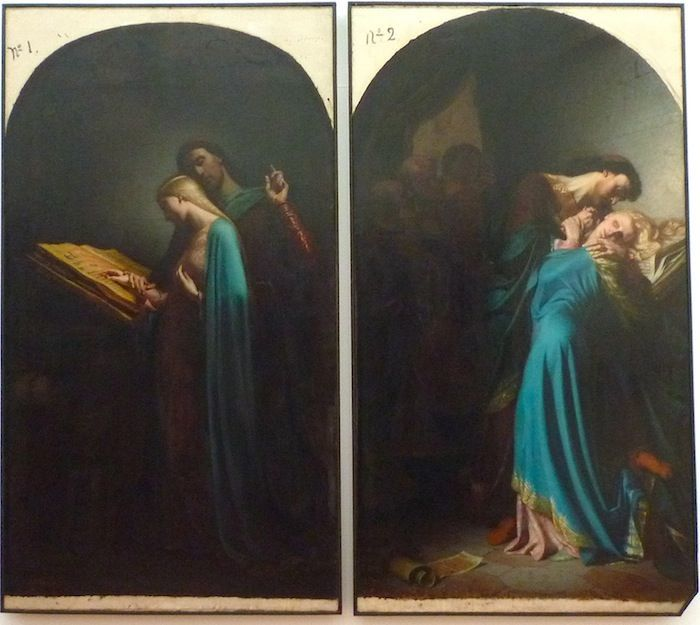
Léon-Marie-Joseph Billardet (1818–1862), Abelard Instructing Heloise. Note Heloise's cowering position in the second panel.

Most scholars differ in their interpretation of Abelard's self-depiction. According to William Levitan, fellow of the American academy in Rome, "Readers may be struck by the unattractive figure [the otherwise self praising Abelard] cuts in his own pages....Here the motive [in blaming himself for a cold seduction] is part protective...for Abelard to take all the moral burden on himself and shield, to the extent he can, the now widely respected abbess of the Paraclete—and also in part justificatory—to magnify the crime to the proportions of its punishment." David Wulstan writes, "Much of what Abelard says in the Historia Calamitatum does not ring true: his arrogation of blame for the cold seduction of his pupil is hardly fortified by the letters of Heloise; this and various supposed violations seem contrived to build a farrago of supposed guilt which he must expiate by his retreat into monasticism and by distancing himself from his former lover."

Heloise is thus motivated in her responses to Abelard's letters to set the record straight, that if anything she had initiated their relationship. Héloïse's writings express a much more positive attitude toward their past relationship than does Abelard. She does not renounce her encounters as sinful and she does not "accept that [Abelard's] love for her could die, even by the horrible act of...castration."

It is important in investigating these allegations of abuse or harassment on Abelard's part to consider the crude sexual ethics of the time (in which a prior relationship was generally taken as establishing consent), Heloise's letters which depict her as complicit if not the initiator of sexual interaction, and Abelard's position as an abbot relative to Heloise, an abbess, towards whom he owed a debt of responsibility and guardianship. By depicting himself—a castrated and now repentant monk—as to blame for their liaison, he denied Heloise her own sexual scandal and maintained the purity of her reputation. An allegation of sexual impropriety on the part of Heloise would furthermore endanger the sanctity of Abelard's property, the Paraclete, which could be claimed by more powerful figures in government or the Catholic Church. Heloise's prior convent at Argenteuil and another convent at St. Eloi had already been shut down by the Catholic hierarchy due to accusations of sexual impropriety by nuns. Monasteries run by male monks were generally in no such danger.

Waithe indicated in a 2009 interview with Karen Warren that she has "softened the position [she] took earlier" in light of Mews' subsequent attribution of the Epistolae Duorum Amantium to Abelard and Héloïse (which Waithe accepts), though she continues to find the passage troubling.

== Burial ==
Héloïse's place of burial is uncertain. Abelard's bones were moved to the Oratory of the Paraclete after his death, and after Héloïse's death in 1163/64 her bones were placed alongside his. The bones of the pair were moved more than once afterwards, but they were preserved even through the vicissitudes of the French Revolution, and now are presumed to lie in the well-known tomb in Père Lachaise Cemetery in eastern Paris. The transfer of their remains there in 1817 is considered to have considerably contributed to the popularity of that cemetery, at the time still far outside the built-up area of Paris. By tradition, lovers or lovelorn singles leave letters at the crypt, in tribute to the couple or in hope of finding true love.

This remains, however, disputed. The Oratory of the Paraclete claims Abelard and Héloïse are buried there and that what exists in Père Lachaise is merely a monument, or cenotaph. Others believe that while Abelard is buried in the tomb at Père Lachaise, Heloise's remains are elsewhere.

== Cultural references ==
=== In literature ===
- Jean-Jacques Rousseau's 1761 novel, Julie, ou la nouvelle Héloïse, refers to the history of Héloïse and Abelard.
- Mark Twain's comedic travelogue The Innocents Abroad (1869), in Chapter XV, portrays Abelard as a villain who seduces and debauches innocent Heloise.
- Henry Adams devotes a chapter to Abelard's life in Mont Saint Michel and Chartres
- George Moore's 1921 novel, Heloise and Abelard, treats their entire relationship from first meeting through final parting.
- Charles Williams' 1931 novel The Place of the Lion features a character, Damaris, who focuses her research on Peter Abelard.
- Helen Waddell's 1933 novel Peter Abelard depicts the romance between the two.
- Etienne Gilson's 1938 Héloïse et Abélard contains a historical account of their lives.
- Henry Miller uses Abelard's "Foreword to Historia Calamitatum" as the motto of Tropic of Capricorn (1938).
- Dodie Smith's 1948 novel I Capture the Castle features a dog and a cat named Héloïse and Abelard.
- Marion Meade's 1976 novel Stealing Heaven depicts the romance and was adapted into a film.
- Abelard and Héloïse are referenced throughout Robertson Davies's novel The Rebel Angels.
- Sharan Newman's Catherine LeVendeur series of medieval mysteries feature Héloïse, Abelard, and Astrolabe as occasional characters, mentors and friends of the main character, formerly a novice at the Paraclete.
- Luise Rinser's 1991 novel Abaelard's Liebe (German) depicts the love story of Héloïse and Abelard from the perspective of their son, Astrolabe.
- Lauren Groff's 2006 short story "L. DeBard and Aliette" from her collection Delicate Edible Birds recreates the story of Héloïse and Abelard, set in 1918 New York.
- Wendy Waite's 2008 illustrated rhyming children's story Abelard and Heloise depicts a friendship between two cats named after the medieval lovers.
- Sherry Jones's 2014 novel, The Sharp Hook of Love, is a fictional account of Abelard and Héloïse.
- Mandy Hager's 2017 novel, Heloise, tells Heloise's story from childhood to death, with frequent reference to their writings.
- Rick Riordan's 2017 book, Trials of Apollo: The Dark Prophesy, has a pair of gryphons named Heloise and Abelard.
- James Carroll's 2017 novel The Cloister retells the story of Abelard and Héloïse, interweaving it with the friendship of a Catholic priest and a French Jewish woman in the post-Holocaust twentieth century.
- Melvyn Bragg's 2019 novel Love Without End intertwines the legendary medieval romance of Héloïse and Abelard with a modern-day historian's struggle to reconcile with his daughter.

=== In art ===
- Abaelardus and Heloïse surprised by Master Fulbert, oil, by Romanticist painter Jean Vignaud, 1819
- Héloïse et Abeilard, oil on copper, Jean-Baptiste Goyet, 1830.
- Heloise & Abelard, painting by Salvador Dalí
- Monument to Abelard and Heloise at Le Pallet, bronze sculpture by Sylviane and Bilal Hassan-Courgeau

=== In music ===
- The intro to the Cole Porter song "Just One of Those Things" includes "As Abelard said to Heloise, Don't forget to drop a line to me please".
- Abelard and Heloise is a 1970 soundtrack album by the British Third Ear Band.
- Scritti Politti's song, "The World You Understand (Is Over + Over + Over)" (from the 1999 album Anomie & Bonhomie) refers to Heloise and Abelard and the interment of the two lovers at Pere Lachaise cemetery.
- "Heloise and Abelard", a song written by SCA bard Efenwealt Wystle (aka Scott Vaughan)
- The song "Heloise" by Frank Black, from the album Devil's Workshop, refers to this story.
- The lyrics of "Abelard and Heloise", featured on Seventh Angel's album The Dust of Years, are based on the couple's famous correspondence.
- The song "World Without" by A Fine Frenzy (Alison Sudol) references them: "And Heloise, gave her whole heart to Pete, now eternally sleeps by his side"

=== In poetry ===
- François Villon's "Ballade des dames du temps jadis" ("Ballad of the Ladies of Times Past") mentions Héloïse and Abelard in the second stanza.
- Their story inspired the poem, "Eloisa to Abelard", by the English poet Alexander Pope.
- Their story inspired the poem, "The Convent Threshold", by the Victorian English poet Christina Rossetti.
- In Robert Lowell's poetry collection History (1973), the poem "Eloise and Abelard" portrays the lovers after their separation.
- Anne Carson's 2005 collection Decreation includes a screenplay about Abelard and Héloïse.

=== Onstage and onscreen ===
- Ronald Millar's play Abelard & Heloise was a 1971 Broadway production at the Brooks Atkinson Theatre, starring Diana Rigg and Keith Michell, script published by Samuel French, Inc, London, 1970.
- The film, Stealing Heaven (1988), chronicles their story and stars Derek de Lint, Kim Thomson, and Denholm Elliott. The film is based on Marion Meade's 1979 novel of same name.
- In the film Being John Malkovich, the character Craig Schwartz (played by John Cusack), a failed puppeteer, stages a sidewalk puppet show depicting correspondence between Héloïse and Abelard. This gets him beaten up by an irate father, due to its sexual suggestiveness.
- In the second season of Da Vinci's Inquest a forensic pathologist remarks that a set of unidentified co-interred male and female remains may be another Abelard and Heloise.
- Howard Brenton's play, In Extremis: The Story of Abelard and Heloise, premiered at Shakespeare's Globe in as of 2006.
- In the HBO series The Sopranos, the character Carmela Soprano finds a copy of The Letters of Abelard and Heloise in the bathroom of her extramarital lover. Various parallels are drawn throughout the fifth season.
- Howard Brenton's play In Extremis: The Story Of Abelard & Heloise was premiered at Shakespeare's Globe in 2006.
- Michael Shenefelt's stage play, Heloise, 2019

== See also ==
- Peter the Venerable
- Bernard of Clairvaux
- Astrolabe
- Stealing Heaven
- Hildegarde of Bingen
- Teresa of Avila
- Sei Shōnagon
