= In Extremis (play) =

Play by Howard Brenton

In Extremis: The Story of Abelard and Heloise
- Abelard and Heloise
- Original language: English
- Written by: Howard Brenton
- Characters: Heloise, Abelard, Bernard of Clairvaux
- Setting: 12th century France, particularly Paris

Premiere
- Date: 27 August 2006
- Place: Shakespeare's Globe

In Extremis: The Story of Abelard & Heloise is a play by Howard Brenton on the story of Heloise and Abelard, which premiered at Shakespeare's Globe on 27 August 2006 with a 15 performance run. The play was directed by John Dove with design by Michael Taylor, and music by William Lyons. It was revived for a two-week run from 15 May 2007 with the same director and most of the same cast.

An early draft of the play was written in 1997 at the University of California, Davis during Brenton's term as its Granada Fellow, and performed by MFA students of its Drama Department (with Sarah Pia Anderson directing).

== Synopsis ==
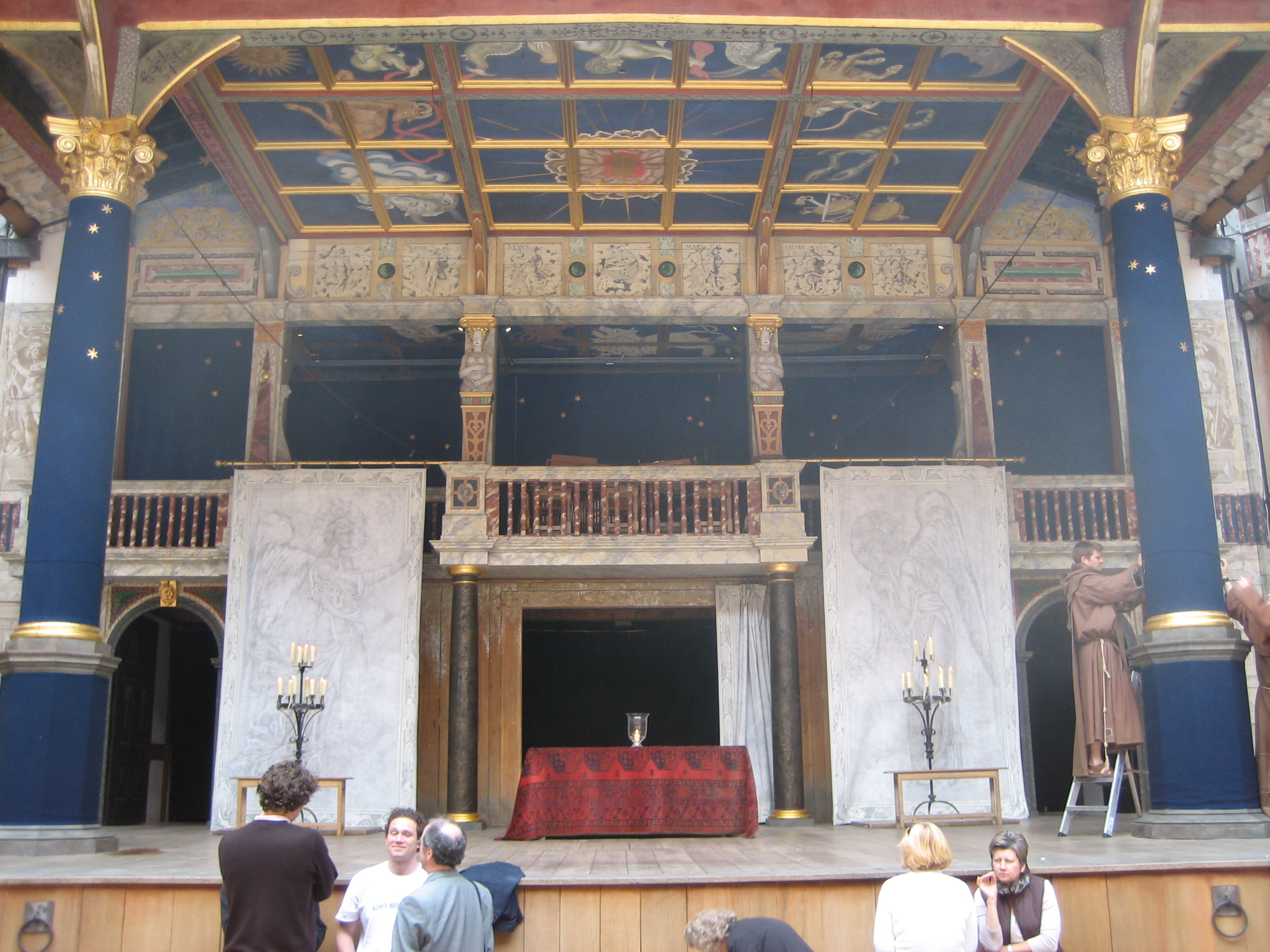
The set for the second run

In twelfth century Paris, is a growing interest in philosophical and religious enquiry. Within its vanguard is Peter Abelard: a sensual, educated man with an independent mind. He enters into an affair with his equally brilliant but disastrously connected student, Heloise. However, this affair is just the pretext his more conservative enemies need to discredit him and, in doing so, start a war of ideas.

== Plot ==
Abelard, arguing with his teacher William of Champeaux, sets up a new, dialectic philosophical school of his own, which proves popular and is even fashionable at the royal court of France. One of his followers is Heloise, with whom he also starts a sexual affair, under the guise of private tuition. His school's success worries Bernard of Clairvaux, who feels it is subjecting divine revelation to reason and may thus destroy the Roman Catholic Church and Christianity itself, but for now he merely subjects Abelard to surveillance rather than opposition. Bernard and Abelard do meet, briefly, at the court when Bernard goes there to force the king to give back lands he had seized illegally from a French bishop. Abelard tries to explain that he is not trying to destroy religion but to better understand it through reason using the brain and intellect that God has given him. However, Bernard will not accept this and refuses to accept Abelard's challenge to dispute with him publicly, as Bernard dogmatically feels he is right and Abelard is wrong and so there is nothing to dispute.

Bernard's agents Alberic and Lotholf reveal the affair to Heloise's uncle and surrogate father Fulbert, a canon of Notre Dame, and he is disgusted by it. Abelard offers to marry Heloise to resolve the situation and remove the disgrace, but she refuses, wanting to be his lover rather than conform to the oppressive norm of medieval marriage. She is smuggled out of Paris to Abelard's sister Denise in Brittany, where she gives birth to their child and waits until two years later Abelard arrives. They return to Paris and get married secretly in Fulbert's garden, but he then refuses to accept a secret marriage and they flee together to a nunnery where Heloise was taught as a girl. There they are kept apart in separate rooms, but secretly consummate their marriage on the altar of the monastery chapel. Abelard is then hunted down and castrated by Fulbert's cousins in Fulbert's presence, and both he and Heloise are forced to enter monasteries.

Bernard at last accepts the challenge to publicly dispute with Abelard before the king and bishops of France, but this turns into a show trial when Bernard immediately lists 12 points on which Abelard is heretical and Abelard refuses to answer them, maintaining a complete dignified silence and thus forcing his chief supporter the king to back Bernard and declare Abelard a heretic. Abelard and Bernard meet, and fail to make a reconciliation, and then Heloise attends Abelard on his deathbed. After Abelard's death, Bernard burns all of Abelard's heretical works and thus thinks he has won the struggle with him. He then goes to Heloise to affect a reconciliation, but this also fails. The play then ends abruptly with Heloise anachronistically showing Bernard a 20th-century, Penguin copy of the couple's letters, to prove that he has not erased Abelard and Heloise from history as effectively as he thought.

== Cast of Globe productions ==
Book-cover for the playtext

- Abelard - Oliver Boot
- Heloise - Sally Bretton
- Bernard of Clairvaux - Jack Laskey
- Fulbert, Heloise's uncle - Fred Ridgeway (2006)/ Paul Copley (2007)
- Denise, Abelard's sister - Pascale Burgess
- William of Champeaux - John Bett
- Louis VI - Colin Hurley
- Alberic* - Patrick Brennan (2006) / Michael Gould (2007)
- Lotholf* - William Mannering
- Helene, abbess / working woman 1 - Sheila Reid (2006) / Eleanor Bron (2007)
- Student / Courtier / Bishop / Monk - Tas Emiabata
- Berthode - Niamh McCann
- Cousin 1 / Company - Andrew Vincent
- Cousin 2 / Company - Simon Muller
- Francine/Franny - Rhiannon Oliver
- Student / Courtier / Bishop / Monk - Alex Kerr
- Student / Chamberlain / Bishop / Monk - Paul Rainbow
- Marie / Courtier / Nun / Company - Frances Thorburn (2006) / Jenni Maitland (2007)

* - Described in the programme by Brenton as "a kind of Rosencrantz and Guildenstern double act", comic relief from the main themes.

== Reviews ==
=== 2006 ===
- The Stage
- Michael Billington (4 September 2006). "In Extremis". The Guardian.
- Times
- Independent
- Telegraph
- Lyn Gardner (24 May 2007). "In Extremis". The Guardian.
