= Roger Bradshaigh Lloyd =

Anglican priest (1901–1966)

Roger Bradshaigh Lloyd (16 January 1901 – 15 September 1966) was an influential Anglican priest and wide-ranging writer in the immediate context of the Second World War and the mid-twentieth century.

== Biography ==
Born in Eccles, Lancashire, Lloyd was the eldest son of Colonel Walter Evans Lloyd. He was educated at Shrewsbury School and St John's College, Cambridge. After his ordination in 1924, he served in several parishes in the North of England before becoming Canon Residentiary of Winchester, where he was later to be Vice-Dean of the cathedral. He remained there until his death in 1966.

Influenced by Christian socialism and the heritage of the Oxford Movement, he was known for his contemporary histories of the Church of England, and particularly for a challenge to the ideologies prevailing in continental Europe in the 1930s. Lloyd was interested in the response of workers to religion. In 1943 he launched a movement, the Servants of Christ the King, described in his book An Adventure in Discipleship. His writings included books on Abelard and railways and fiction as well as on religious subjects. For many years he was a regular contributor to The Guardian newspaper.

He was married to Mildred Vera Frodsham Ward in 1928. He died at his home in Winchester.

== Works ==
- The Approach to the Reformation (Leonard Parsons, 1925)
- The Undisciplined Life: an Examination of Aldous Huxley's recent works (SPCK, 1932)
- The Stricken Lute: a life of Peter Abelard (Lovat & Dickson, 1932)
- The Divine Purpose (Industrial Christian Fellowship, 1934)
- The Religious Crisis (Lovat Dickson, 1934)
- Christianity, History and Civilisation (Lovat, Dickson & Thompson, 1936)
- Crown Him Lord of All (Hodder & Stoughton, 1936)
- The Beloved Community (Nisbet, 1937: 2nd edition Latimer House, 1948)
- Revolutionary Religion: Christianity, Fascism and Communism (SCM, 1938)
- The Golden Middle Age (Ayer Publishing Co, 1939)
- The Mastery of Evil (Centenary Press, 1941)
- The Inspiration of God (Geoffrey Bles, 1944)
- The Glorious Liberty (Longmans, 1946)
- The Church of England in the Twentieth Century vol 1 (Longmans, 1946)
- Peter Abelard: The Orthodox Rebel (Latimer House, 1947) [2nd edition of The Stricken Lute, see above]
- The Mission of the Anglican Communion (with E R Morgan: SPCK, 1948)
- The Book of Common Prayer and Pastoral Ministry (SPCK, 1949)
- The Church of England in the Twentieth Century vol 2 (Longmans Green & Co, 1950)
- The Fascination of Railways (Allen & Unwin, 1951)
- The Church and the Artisan Today (Longmans Green, 1952)
- An Adventure in Discipleship: The Servants of Christ the King (Longmans, Green & Co, 1953)
- Railwaymen's Gallery (George Allen & Unwin, 1953)
- Farewell to Steam (George Allen & Unwin, 1956)
- The Letters of Luke the Physician (Allen & Unwin, 1957)
- Letters from the Early Church (George Allen & Unwin, 1960)
- The Borderland: an Exploration of Theology in English Literature (Allen & Unwin, 1960)
- The Troubling of the City (George Allen & Unwin, 1962)
- The Ferment in the Church (SCM, 1964)
- The Church of England 1900-1965 (SCM, 1966) [revised and expanded from The Church of England in the Twentieth Century vols 1 and 2, see above]
