= Abelyar =

Abelyar (Russian: Абеля́р) is a Russian male first name. It was included into various Soviet calendars in 1924–1930, which included the new and often artificially created names promoting the new Soviet realities and encouraging the break with the tradition of using the names in Synodal Menologia. The name was created to honor Pierre Abélard (romanized from Russian as Pyer Abelyar), a medieval French scholastic philosopher.
