= John Dove (disambiguation) =

John Dove (died 1664/5), regicide of Charles I.

John Dove may also refer to:

- John Dove (director), British theatre director who directed In Extremis
- John Dove (1872–1934), editor of The Round Table in years 1921–1934
- John R. Dove (1924–1997), English professor of linguistics

== See also ==
- Jonathan Dove, British composer
