= Anselm of Laon =

French biblical scholar, d. 1117

- Born: c. 1050; Laon, Kingdom of France
- Died: 15 July 1117; Laon, Kingdom of France

Education
- Academic advisor: Anselm of Canterbury

Philosophical work
- Era: Medieval philosophy
- Region: Western philosophy
- School: Scholasticism
- Institutions: Cathedral school of Laon
- Notable students: Gilbert de la Porrée; Peter Abelard; William of Champeaux
- Main interests: Theology
- Notable ideas: Biblical hermeneutics, glossa ordinaria

Anselm of Laon (Latin: Anselmus; d. 15 July 1117), properly Ansel (Ansellus), was a French theologian and founder of a school of scholars who helped to pioneer biblical hermeneutics.

== Biography ==
Born of very humble parents at Laon before the middle of the 11th century, he is said to have studied under Anselm of Canterbury at Bec, though this is almost certainly incorrect. Other potential teachers of Anselm have been identified, including Bruno of Cologne and Manegold of Lautenbach. He went on to teach scholastic theology at Paris.

By around 1080, he had moved back to his place of birth and was teaching at the cathedral school of Laon, with his brother Ralph. Around 1109, he became dean and chancellor of the cathedral, and in 1115 he was one of Laon's archdeacons.

His school for theology and exegesis rapidly became the most well known in Europe. Famously, in 1113, he expelled Peter Abelard from his school.

The Liber Pancrisi (c. 1120) names him, with his brother Ralph, Ivo of Chartres, and William of Champeaux, as one of the four modern masters.

== Work ==
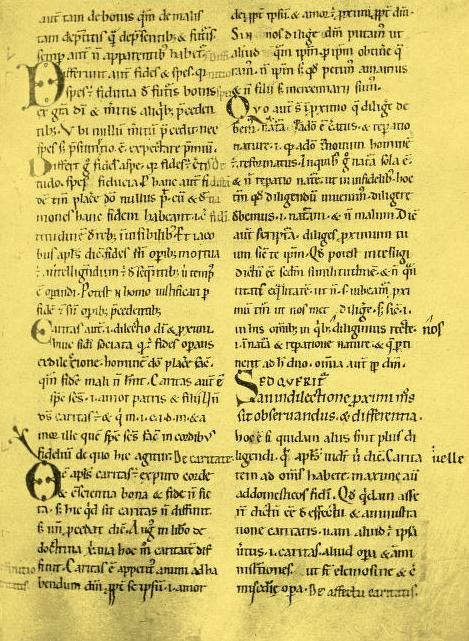
Systematic Sentences attributed to St. Anselm of Laon.

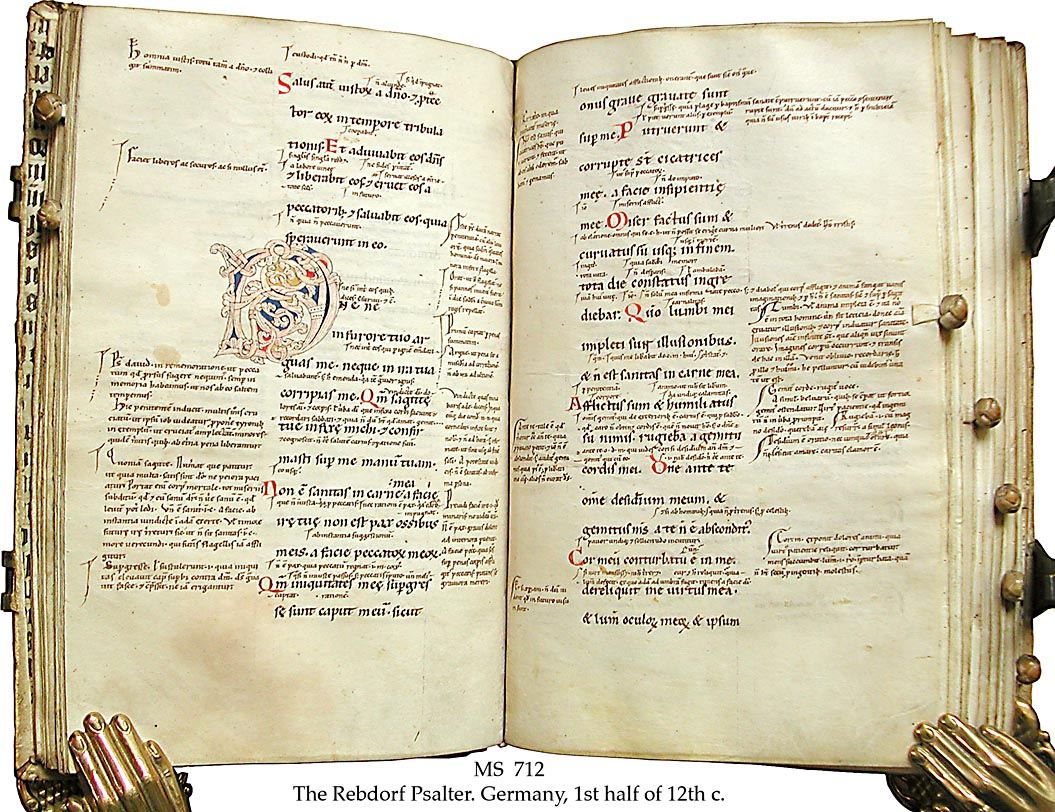
The Rebdorf Psalter: Book of Psalms with Gloss by Anselm of Laon.

Anselm's greatest work, an interlinear and marginal gloss on the 'Scriptures', the glossa ordinaria, now attributed to him and his followers, was one of the great intellectual achievements of the Middle Ages. It has been frequently reprinted. The significance of the gloss, which was most likely assembled after Anselm's death by his students, such as Gilbert de la Porrée, and based on Anselm's teaching, is that it marked a new way of learning — it represented the birth of efforts to present discrete patristic and earlier medieval interpretations of individual verses of Scripture in a readily accessible, easily referenced way. This theme was subsequently adopted and extended by the likes of Hugh of St. Victor, Peter Lombard and later Thomas Aquinas, who gave us 'handbooks' for what we would now call theology.

Other commentaries apparently by Anselm have been ascribed to various writers, principally to Anselm of Canterbury. (Note: A list of them, with notice of Anselm's life, is contained in the Histoire littéraire de la France, x. 170-189.)

The works are collected in Patrologia Latina. Some of his Sententiae were edited at Milan by G. Lefevre in 1894. The commentary on the Psalms attributed to Haymo of Halberstadt by Migne has also been identified as possibly being the work of Anselm.
