= Ferreux-Quincey =

Commune in Grand Est, France

- Commune
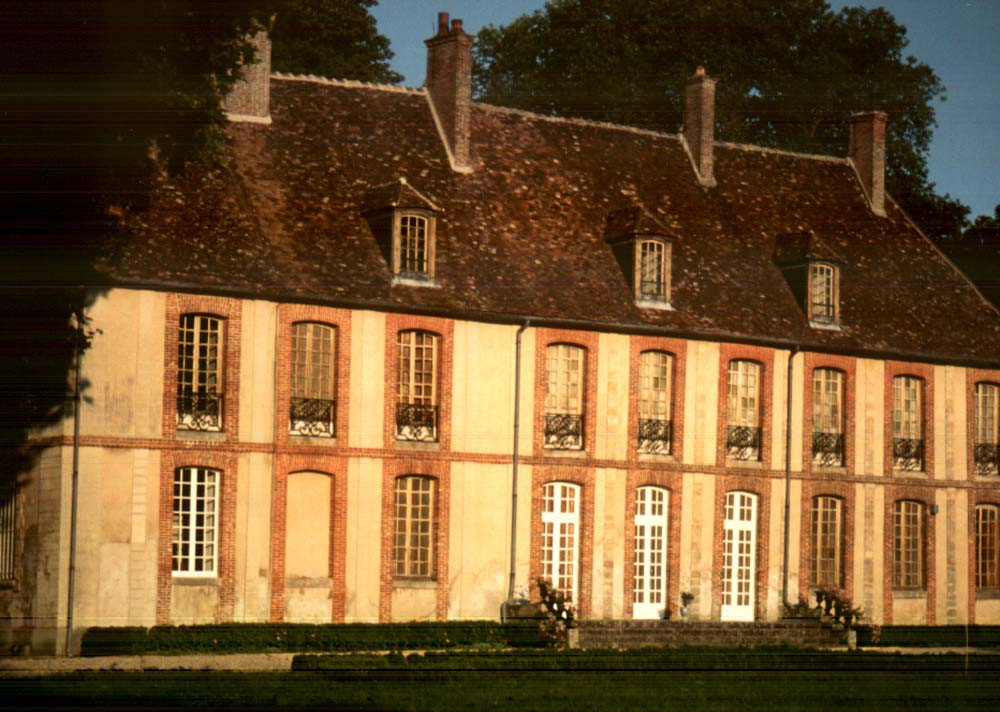
- The chateau in Ferreux-Quincey

- Coat of arms
- Location of Ferreux-Quincey
- Location within France Location within Grand Est
- Coordinates: 48°27′05″N 3°36′47″E
- Country: France
- Region: Grand Est
- Department: Aube
- Arrondissement: Nogent-sur-Seine
- Canton: Nogent-sur-Seine
- Intercommunality: Nogentais

Government
  - Mayor (2020–2026): Maxence Meunier
- Area^{1}: 15.32 km^{2} (5.92 sq mi)
- Population (2023): 404
  - Density: 26.4/km^{2} (68.3/sq mi)
- Time zone: UTC+01:00 (CET)
  - Summer (DST): UTC+02:00 (CEST)
- INSEE/Postal code: 10148 /10400
- ^{1} French Land Register data, which excludes lakes, ponds, glaciers > 1 km^{2} (0.386 sq mi or 247 acres) and river estuaries.

Ferreux-Quincey (French pronunciation: [fɛʁø kɛ̃sɛ]) is a commune in the Aube department in north-central France. It was the site of the Benedictine Abbey of the Paraclete.

== Population ==
Historical population
Year	Pop.	±% p.a.
1968	247	—
1975	236	−0.65%
1982	270	+1.94%
1990	339	+2.89%
1999	337	−0.07%
2007	341	+0.15%
2012	358	+0.98%
2017	399	+2.19%
2023	404	+0.21%
Source: INSEE

== See also ==
- Communes of the Aube department
