= Sic et Non =

12th-century text by Peter Abelard

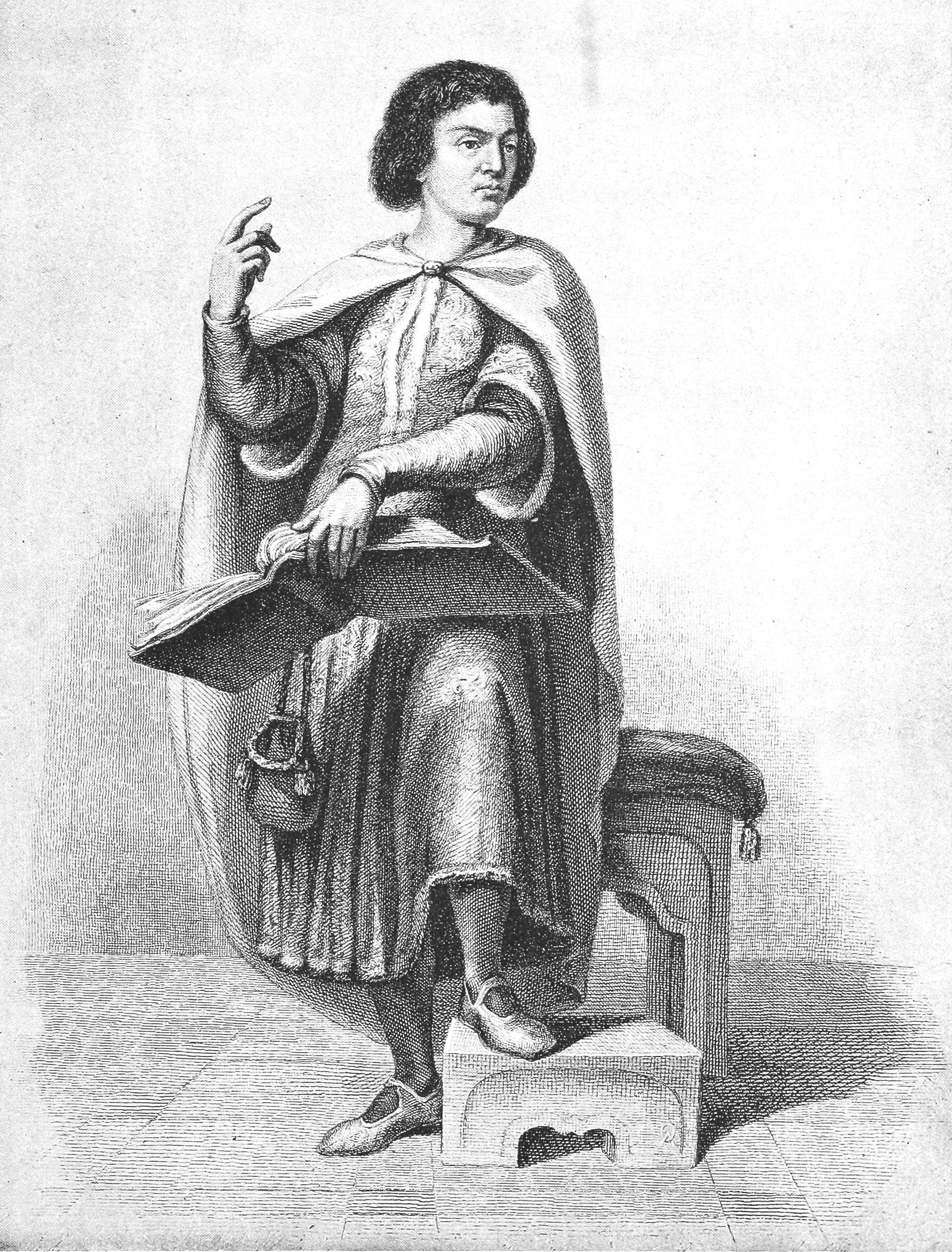
A drawing of Peter Abelard

Sic et Non, an early (c. 1121) scholastic text whose title translates from Medieval Latin as "Yes and No", was written by Peter Abelard. In the work, Abelard juxtaposes apparently contradictory quotations from the Church Fathers on many of the traditional topics of Christian theology. In the Prologue, Abelard outlines rules for reconciling these contradictions, the most important of which is noting the multiple significations of a single word. However, Abelard does not himself apply these rules in the body of the Sic et Non, which has led scholars to conclude that the work was meant as an exercise book for students in applying dialectic (logic) to theology.

== Content ==
In Sic et Non, Abelard presents 158 questions that present a theological assertion and allows its negation.

The first five questions are:

1. Must human faith be completed by reason, or not?
2. Does faith deal only with unseen things, or not?
3. Is there any knowledge of things unseen, or not?
4. May one believe only in God alone, or not?
5. Is God a single unitary being, or not?

The prologue frames the text as a professor's guide, "Aristotle, the most clear-sighted of all the philosophers, was desirous above all things else to arouse this questioning spirit ...".

== Recensions and dating of the Sic et non ==
There are eleven surviving full and partial manuscripts of the Sic et non. These are:

- Zürich, Zentralbibliothek, Car. C. 162, fols. 23–38v (siglum Z)
- Tours, Bibliothèque Municipale, 85, fols. 106rb–118v (siglum T)
- Montecassino, Archivio dell'Abbadia, 174, pp. 277–451 (siglum C)
- Einsiedeln, Stiftsbibliothek, 300, pp. 1–74 (siglum E)
- Brescia, Biblioteca Quiriniana, A.V. 21, fols. 14–64v (siglum B)
- Douai, Bibliothèque Municipale, 357, fols. 140–155v (siglum D)
- London, British Library, Royal 11 A v, fols. 73–98v (siglum L)
- München, Bayerische Staatsbibliothek, Clm. 18926, fols. 14v–105v (siglum M)
- Cambridge, University Library, Kk 3.24, fols. 67v–159 (siglum K)
- Avranches, Bibliothèque Municipale, 12, fols. 132–07 (siglum A)
- Cambridge, Corpus Christi College, 165, pp. 1–355 (siglum k)

There is also one surviving manuscript containing solely q. 117:

- Turin, Biblioteca Nazionale, MS E. v. 9 (749) (siglum S).

An examination of these manuscripts demonstrates the existence of successive drafts of the Sic et Non.

- Z is the earliest known recension of the Sic et non, which, according to Constant Mews, dates to 1121. Parallels between Z and Abelard's other works from this period show that Z is not an abbreviation of the TCEBS recension of the Sic et non, as Boyer and McKeon believed.
- TCEB and S belong to the next earliest recension of the Sic et non, which dates to 1121–1126.
- DL belong to an intermediate recension of the Sic et non, which likewise dates to the period 1121–1126.
- MKAk belong to the latest recension of the Sic et non, which dates to the period 1127–1132.

== Bibliography ==
- Peter Abelard. Sic et non. Full Latin text provided by Peter King.
- Peter Abelard. Sic et non: A Critical Edition. Ed. Blanche B. Boyer and Richard McKeon. Chicago: The University of Chicago Press, 1976.
- Throop, Priscilla, trans., YES AND NO: Peter Abelard's SIC ET NON, Charlotte, VT: MedievalMS, 2007.
- Barrow, Julia. "Tractatus magistri Petri Abaielardi de sacramento altaris." Traditio 40 (1985): 328–36.
- Buytaert, E. M. General introduction to Petri Abaelardi opera theologica. CCCM 11. Turnhout 1969. p. xiii.
- Mews, Constant. General introduction to Petri Abaelardi opera theologica. CCCM 13. Turnhout 1987. p. 21 and p. 51.
