= Abbey of the Paraclete =

12th-century French monastery

Coordinates: 48°28′05″N 3°34′13″E

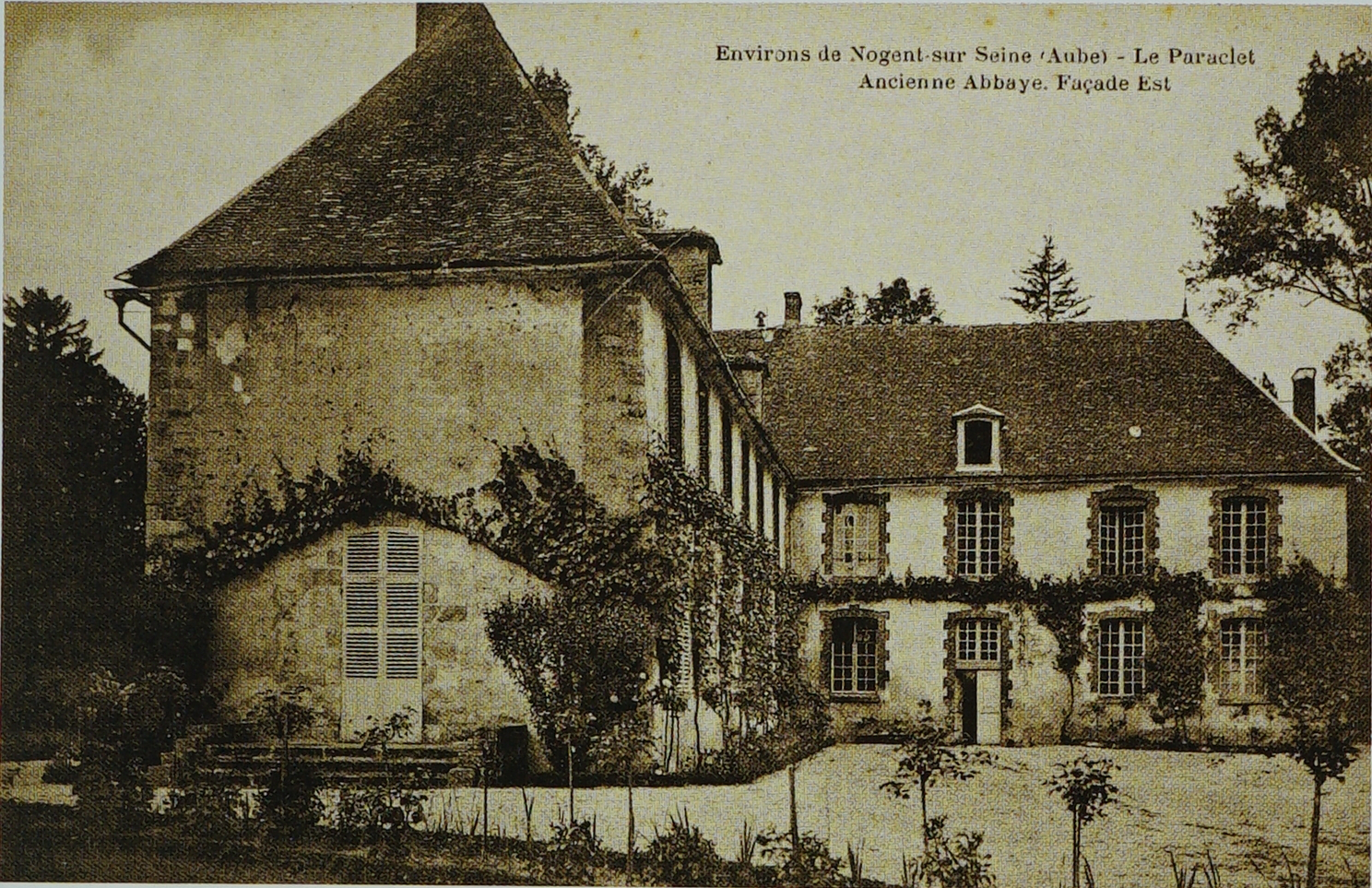
Former abbey of the Paraclete

The Abbey of the Paraclete (French: Abbaye du Paraclet) was a Benedictine monastery founded by Peter Abelard in Ferreux-Quincey, France, after he left the Abbey of St. Denis about 1121. Paraclete comes from the Greek word meaning "one who consoles" and is found in the Gospel of John (16:7) as a name for the Holy Spirit.

In 1125 Abelard was elected by the monks of the Abbey at Saint-Gildas-de-Rhuys, near Vannes, Brittany, to be their abbot. He turned the Paraclete over to the recently displaced Héloïse, his wife, who had been in a nunnery in Argenteuil before its disbandment by Abbot Suger. The Paraclete was rededicated as a nunnery. Heloise became the Paraclete's abbess and spent the rest of her life there.

She and Abelard were buried together there (Abelard c. 1142, Heloise c. 1164) until 1792, when their remains were transferred to the church of Nogent-sur-Seine nearby. In 1817, their bodies were reportedly moved to a new tomb at Pere Lachaise Cemetery in Paris, but whether they are both actually buried there remains a matter of dispute.

A large part of the abbey was demolished in the French Revolution. The remaining buildings are a barn and a dovecote from the early 17th century, and a conventual building from the 18th century. These are listed monuments, as well as the monument to Héloïse and Abélard. A chapel was built in the early 20th century.
