= Historia Calamitatum =

Memoir or auto biography of Abelard

Historia Calamitatum (known in English as The Story of My Misfortunes or The History of My Calamities), also known as Abaelardi ad Amicum Suum Consolatoria, is an autobiographical work in Latin by Peter Abelard (1079–1142), a medieval French pioneer of scholastic philosophy. The work, written in 1132 or soon after, is one of the first autobiographical works in medieval Western Europe, written in the form of a letter (and, as such, is clearly influenced by Augustine's Confessions).

The letter is an extensive self-analysis of Abelard up to the age of about fifty-four, and provides readers with knowledge of his views of women, learning, monastic life, Church and State combined, and the social milieu of the time.

Abelard emphasizes how persecuted he feels by his peers throughout the work. He quotes saints, apostles, and at one point, compares his struggles to those of Christ.

== Editions ==
- The Letters of Abelard and Heloise, trans. Betty Radice (Penguin, 1974) [contains translation of the Historia Calamitatum on pp. 57–106]
- Peter Abélard, Historia calamitatum: The Story of My Misfortunes: An Autobiography, tr. Henry Adams Bellows, St. Paul, Minnesota: Boyd, 1922, OCLC 1005715, repr. New York: Macmillan / London: Collier-Macmillan, 1972, OCLC 556463613
