= Frances Thorburn =

Scottish actress

- Born: Scotland
- Occupation: Actress
- Years active: 1980–present
- Known for: River City, Taggart, Waterloo Road

Frances Thorburn is a Scottish actress and singer. She played Kim Monroe in BBC series River City, and has starred in theatre plays and musicals.

On stage, she has starred as Judy Garland in Frances and Ethel at Òran Mór in Glasgow. She played Marilyn Monroe at the Citizens Theatre in Glasgow and has appeared in several other Òran Mór productions, such as A Bottle Of Wine And Patsy Cline. In 2026, she appeared in a production of Sunset Boulevard, performing alongside Juliet Cadzow at Perth Theatre in Perth, Scotland.

Thorburn is set to star in Doris, Dolly and the Dressing Room Divas at the The Gilded Balloon for the Edinburgh Festival Fringe programme in 2026.
