= Le Pallet =

- Commune
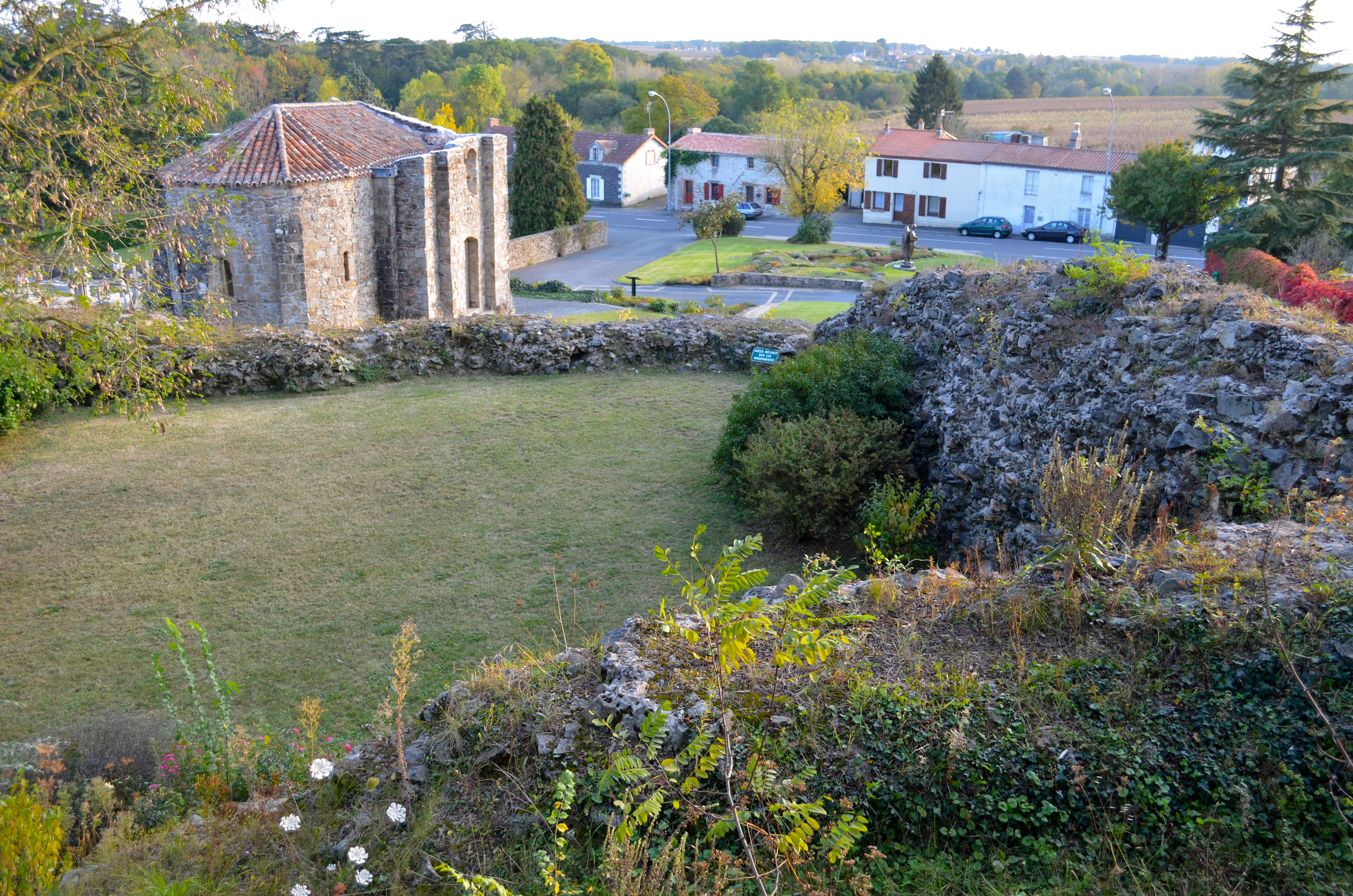
- Chapel of Sainte-Anne

- Coat of arms
- Location of Le Pallet
- Location within France Location within Pays de la Loire
- Coordinates: 47°08′20″N 1°20′04″W
- Country: France
- Region: Pays de la Loire
- Department: Loire-Atlantique
- Arrondissement: Nantes
- Canton: Vallet
- Intercommunality: Sèvre et Loire

Government
  - Mayor (2021–2026): Joël Baraud
- Area^{1}: 11.75 km^{2} (4.54 sq mi)
- Elevation: 37 m (121 ft)
- Highest elevation: 52 m (171 ft)
- Lowest elevation: 2 m (6.6 ft)
- Population (2023): 3,413
  - Density: 290.5/km^{2} (752.3/sq mi)
- Time zone: UTC+01:00 (CET)
  - Summer (DST): UTC+02:00 (CEST)
- INSEE/Postal code: 44117 /44330
- ^{1} French Land Register data, which excludes lakes, ponds, glaciers > 1 km^{2} (0.386 sq mi or 247 acres) and river estuaries.

Le Pallet (French pronunciation: [lə palɛ]; Breton: Ar Palez) is a commune in the Loire-Atlantique département in western France.

It lies on the river Sèvre Nantaise.

== Population ==
Historical population

Year	Pop.	±% p.a.
1793	1,500	—
1821	1,102	−1.10%
1846	1,448	+1.10%
1872	1,641	+0.48%
1901	1,590	−0.11%
1926	1,401	−0.50%
1946	1,332	−0.25%
1962	1,371	+0.18%
1968	1,442	+0.85%

Year	Pop.	±% p.a.
1975	1,507	+0.63%
1982	1,857	+3.03%
1990	2,070	+1.37%
1999	2,394	+1.63%
2007	2,603	+1.05%
2012	3,111	+3.63%
2017	3,239	+0.81%
2023	3,413	+0.88%

Source: EHESS and INSEE (1968-2023)

== Personalities ==
- Peter Abelard (1079–1142), scholastic philosopher and theologian

== See also ==
- Communes of the Loire-Atlantique department
