= Peter Abelard =

French philosopher (c. 1079–1142)

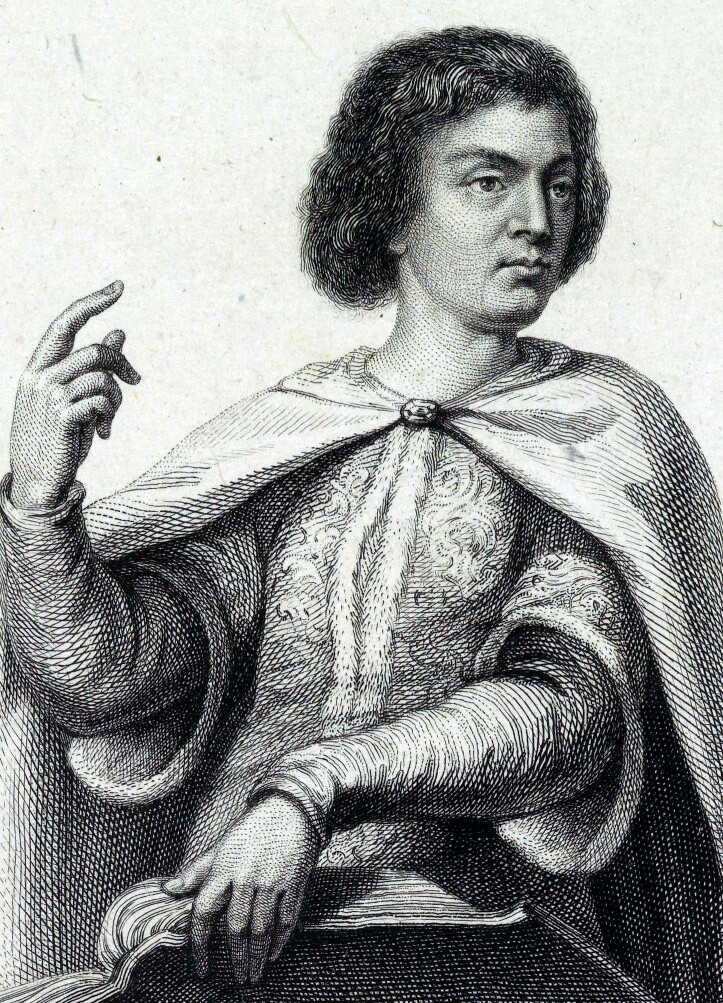
- Depiction by Antoni Oleszczyński, before 1841
- Born: Pierre le Pallet; 1079; Le Pallet near Nantes, France
- Died: 21 April 1142 (age 62 or 63); Abbey of Saint-Marcel near Chalon-sur-Saône, France

Education
- Academic advisors: Anselm of Laon, Roscellinus, William of Champeaux

Philosophical work
- Era: Medieval philosophy
- Region: Western philosophy
- School: Scholasticism; Peripatetics; Conceptualism
- Notable students: Héloïse, John of Salisbury
- Main interests: Metaphysics, logic, philosophy of language, theology
- Notable works: Sic et Non
- Notable ideas: Conceptualism, limbo, moral influence theory of atonement

Peter Abelard (Note: /ˈæbəlɑːrd/; French: Pierre Abélard [abelaʁ]; Latin: Petrus Abaelardus or Abailardus) (12 February 1079 – 21 April 1142) was a French philosopher, logician, theologian, composer, and poet, regarded as one of the most brilliant and controversial theologians of his time. Born at Pallet, near Nantes, he became a popular lecturer in Paris, but his academic career was cut short after his love affair with his student and eventual wife, Héloïse d'Argenteuil. Their relationship and philosophical exchange later became the aspect of his life for which he is best known in history and popular culture.

In philosophy, Abelard challenged the prevailing philosophical orthodoxy and is celebrated for his logical treatment of the problem of universals through nominalism and conceptualism, thereby helping to prepare the way for nominalism, as well as for pioneering the role of intent in ethics. He has often been called the "Descartes of the twelfth century" and has been considered a forerunner of Rousseau, Kant, and Spinoza. He is also sometimes credited as a major forerunner of modern empiricism.

In Catholic theology, Abelard was condemned for his teaching on the Trinity. He is particularly known for developing the concept of limbo and for introducing the moral influence theory of atonement. His doctrine of the atonement emphasized the love of Christ as manifested in his life and Passion, which in turn calls forth a human response of love, and this conception has had a continuing influence. Abelard expressed its underlying purpose in the words: "The purpose and cause of the incarnation was that God might illuminate the world by his wisdom and stir it to the love of himself."

Abelard is also regarded, alongside Augustine, as one of the most significant forerunners of the modern self-reflective autobiographer. His publicly circulated autobiographical letter, The History of My Calamities, together with his public correspondence, helped establish the tone for later epistolary novels and public accounts of the private lives of prominent figures. His works also include Christian Theology, Ethics, and his letters to Héloïse.

== Biography ==
=== Early life and education ===
Abelard, originally called "Pierre le Pallet", was born c. 1079 in Le Pallet, about 10 miles (16 km) east of Nantes, in Brittany, the eldest son of a minor noble French family. As a boy, he learned quickly. His father, a knight called Berenger, encouraged his son to study the liberal arts, wherein he excelled at the art of dialectic (a branch of philosophy). Instead of entering a military career, as his father had done, Abelard became an academic.

During his early academic pursuits, Abelard wandered throughout France, debating and learning, so as (in his own words) "he became such a one as the Peripatetics." He first studied in the Loire area, where the nominalist Roscellinus of Compiègne, who had been accused of heresy by Anselm of Canterbury, was his teacher during this period.

=== Early career ===
Around 1100, Abelard's travels brought him to Paris. Around this time he changed his surname to "Abelard", sometimes written "Abailard" or "Abaelardus". The etymological root of Abelard could be the Middle French abilite (ability), the Hebrew name Abel/Habal (breath/vanity/figure in Genesis), the English "apple" or the Latin ballare, (to dance). The name is jokingly referenced as relating to "lard", as in excessive ("fatty") learning, in a secondary anecdote referencing Adelard of Bath and Peter Abelard (and in which they are confused to be one person).

In the great cathedral school of Notre-Dame de Paris (before the construction of the current cathedral there), he studied under Paris archdeacon and Notre Dame master William of Champeaux, later bishop of Châlons-en-Champagne, a disciple of Anselm of Laon (not to be confused with Anselm of Canterbury), a leading proponent of philosophical realism. Retrospectively, Abelard portrays William as having turned from approval to hostility when Abelard proved soon able to defeat his master in argument. This resulted in a long duel that eventually ended in the downfall of the theory of realism which was replaced by Abelard's theory of conceptualism/nominalism. While Abelard's thought was closer to William's thought than this account might suggest, William thought Abelard was too arrogant. It was during this time that Abelard would provoke quarrels with both William and Roscellinus.

Against opposition from the metropolitan teacher, Abelard set up his own school, first at Melun, a favoured royal residence, then, around 1102–4, for more direct competition, he moved to Corbeil, nearer Paris. His teaching was notably successful, but the stress taxed his constitution, leading to a nervous breakdown and a trip home to Brittany for several years of recovery.

On his return, after 1108, he found William lecturing at the hermitage of Saint-Victor, just outside the Île de la Cité, and there they once again became rivals, with Abelard challenging William over his theory of universals. Abelard was once more victorious, and Abelard was almost able to attain the position of master at Notre Dame. For a short time, however, William was able to prevent Abelard from lecturing in Paris. Abelard accordingly was forced to resume his school at Melun, which he was then able to move, from c. 1110-12, to Paris itself, on the heights of Montagne Sainte-Geneviève, overlooking Notre-Dame.

From his success in dialectic, he next turned to theology and in 1113 moved to Laon to attend the lectures of Anselm of Laon on Biblical exegesis and Christian doctrine. Unimpressed by Anselm's teaching, Abelard began to offer his own lectures on the book of Ezekiel. Anselm forbade him to continue this teaching. Abelard returned to Paris where, in around 1115, he became master of the cathedral school of Notre Dame and a canon of Sens (the cathedral of the archdiocese to which Paris belonged).

=== Later life ===
Now in his early forties, Abelard sought to bury himself as a monk of the Abbey of Saint-Denis with his woes out of sight. Finding no respite in the cloister, and having gradually turned again to study, he gave in to urgent entreaties, and reopened his school at an unknown priory owned by the monastery. His lectures, now framed in a devotional spirit, and with lectures on theology as well as his previous lectures on logic, were once again heard by crowds of students, and his old influence seemed to have returned. Using his studies of the Bible and — in his view — inconsistent writings of the leaders of the church as his basis, he wrote Sic et Non (Yes and No).

No sooner had he published his theological lectures (the Theologia Summi Boni) than his adversaries picked up on his rationalistic interpretation of the Trinitarian dogma. Two pupils of Anselm of Laon, Alberich of Reims and Lotulf of Lombardy, instigated proceedings against Abelard, charging him with the heresy of Sabellius in a provincial synod held at Soissons in 1121. They obtained through irregular procedures an official condemnation of his teaching, and Abelard was made to burn the Theologia himself. He was then sentenced to perpetual confinement in a monastery other than his own, but it seems to have been agreed in advance that this sentence would be revoked almost immediately, because after a few days in the convent of St. Medard at Soissons, Abelard returned to St. Denis.

Life in his own monastery proved no more congenial than before. For this Abelard himself was partly responsible. He took a sort of malicious pleasure in irritating the monks. As if for the sake of a joke, he cited Bede to prove that the believed founder of the monastery of St Denis, Dionysius the Areopagite, had been Bishop of Corinth, while the other monks relied upon the statement of the Abbot Hilduin that he had been Bishop of Athens. When this historical heresy led to the inevitable persecution, Abelard wrote a letter to the Abbot Adam in which he preferred to the authority of Bede that of Eusebius of Caesarea's Historia Ecclesiastica and St. Jerome, according to whom Dionysius of Corinth, was distinct from Dionysius the Areopagite, bishop of Athens and founder of the abbey; although, in deference to Bede, he suggested that the Areopagite might also have been bishop of Corinth. Adam accused him of insulting both the monastery and the Kingdom of France (which had Denis as its patron saint); life in the monastery grew intolerable for Abelard, and he was finally allowed to leave.

Abelard initially lodged at St Ayoul of Provins, where the prior was a friend. Then, after the death of Abbot Adam in March 1122, Abelard was able to gain permission from the new abbot, Suger, to live "in whatever solitary place he wished". In a deserted place near Nogent-sur-Seine in Champagne, he built a cabin of stubble and reeds, and a simple oratory dedicated to the Trinity and became a hermit. When his retreat became known, students flocked from Paris, and covered the wilderness around him with their tents and huts. He began to teach again there. The oratory was rebuilt in wood and stone and rededicated as the Oratory of the Paraclete.

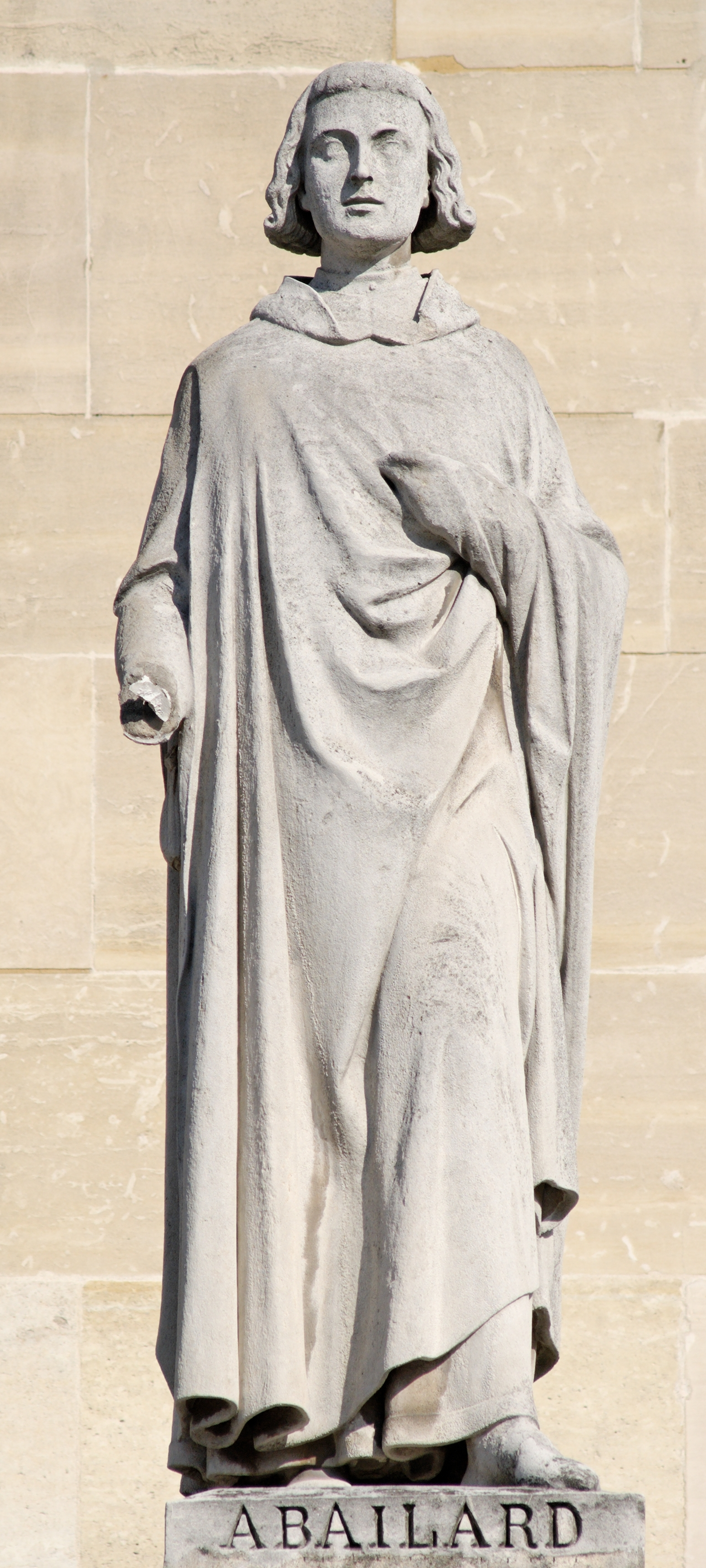
Statue of Abelard at Louvre Palace in Paris by Jules Cavelier

Abelard remained at the Paraclete for about five years. His combination of the teaching of secular arts with his profession as a monk was heavily criticized by other men of religion, and Abelard contemplated flight outside Christendom altogether. Abelard therefore decided to leave and find another refuge, accepting sometime between 1126 and 1128 an invitation to preside over the Abbey of Saint-Gildas-de-Rhuys on the far-off shore of Lower Brittany. The region was inhospitable, the domain a prey to outlaws, the house itself savage and disorderly. There, too, his relations with the community deteriorated.

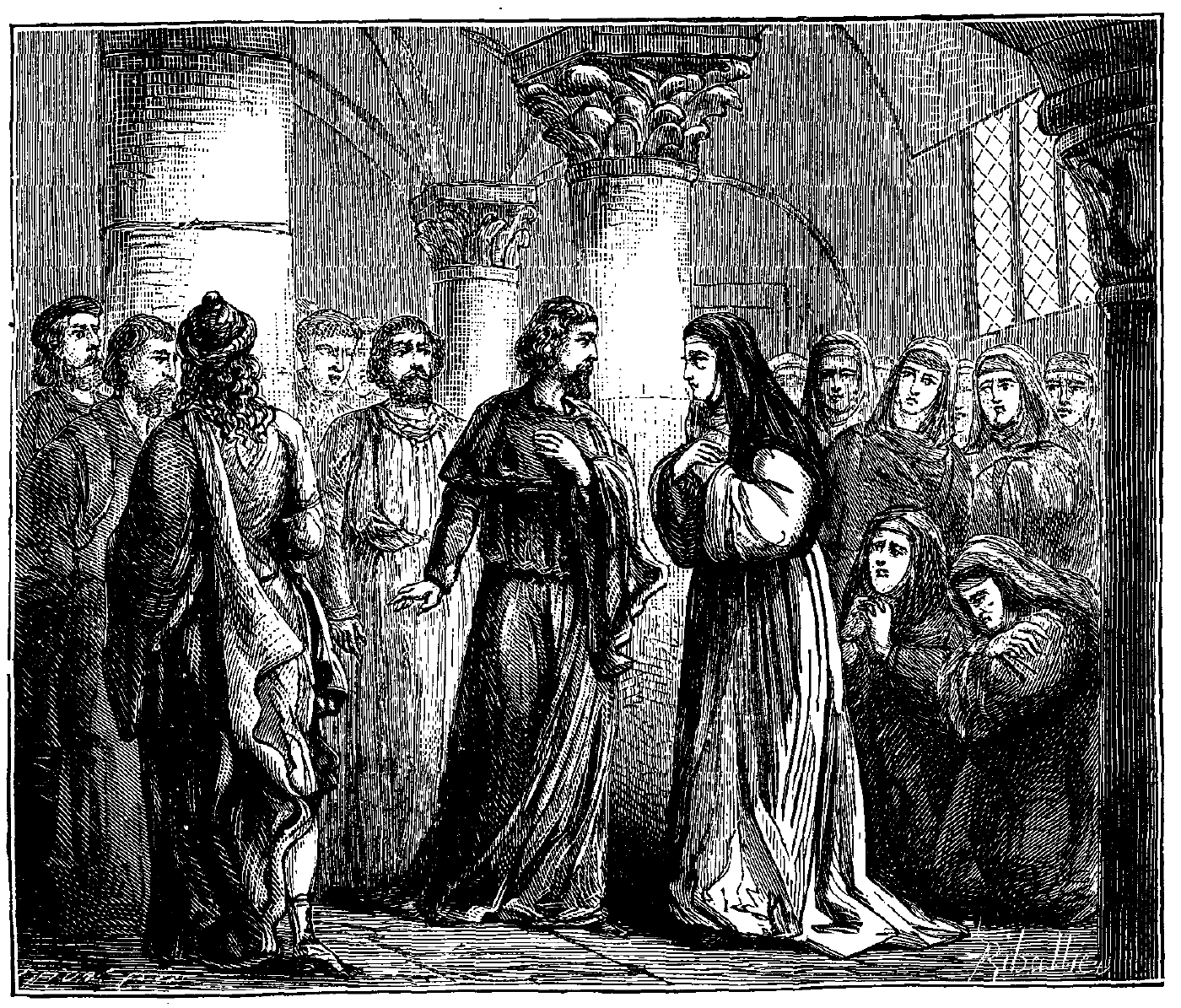
Abelard receives the monastery of the Paraclete Héloïse (1129)

Lack of success at St Gildas made Abelard decide to take up public teaching again (although he remained for a few more years, officially, Abbot of St Gildas). It is not entirely certain what he then did, but given that John of Salisbury heard Abelard lecture on dialectic in 1136, it is presumed that he returned to Paris and resumed teaching on the Montagne Sainte-Geneviève. His lectures were dominated by logic, at least until 1136, when he produced further drafts of his Theologia in which he analyzed the sources of belief in the Trinity and praised the pagan philosophers of classical antiquity for their virtues and for their discovery by the use of reason of many fundamental aspects of Christian revelation.

While Roscellin accused Abelard of having maintained ties with Heloise for some time, it is at this point that Abelard came back into significant contact with Héloïse. In April 1129, Abbot Suger of St Denis succeeded in his plans to have the nuns, including Héloïse, expelled from the convent at Argenteuil, in order to take over the property for St Denis. Héloïse had meanwhile become the head of a new foundation of nuns called the Paraclete. Abelard became the abbot of the new community and provided it with a rule and with a justification of the nun's way of life; in this he emphasized the virtue of literary study. He also provided books of hymns he had composed, and in the early 1130s he and Héloïse composed a collection of their own love letters and religious correspondence containing, amongst other notable pieces, Abelard's most famous letter containing his autobiography, Historia Calamitatum (The History of My Calamities). This moved Héloïse to write her first Letter; the first being followed by the two other Letters, in which she finally accepted the part of resignation, which, now as a brother to a sister, Abelard commended to her. Sometime before 1140, Abelard published his masterpiece, Ethica or Scito te ipsum (Know Thyself), where he analyzes the idea of sin and that actions are not what a man will be judged for but intentions. During this period, he also wrote Dialogus inter Philosophum, Judaeum et Christianum (Dialogue between a Philosopher, a Jew, and a Christian), and also Expositio in Epistolam ad Romanos, a commentary on St. Paul's epistle to the Romans, where he expands on the meaning of Christ's life.

==== Conflicts with Bernard of Clairvaux ====
After 1136, it is not clear whether Abelard had stopped teaching, or whether he perhaps continued with all except his lectures on logic until as late as 1141. Whatever the exact timing, a process was instigated by William of St Thierry, who discovered what he considered to be heresies in some of Abelard's teaching. In spring 1140 he wrote to the Bishop of Chartres and to Bernard of Clairvaux denouncing them. Another, less distinguished, theologian, Thomas of Morigny, also produced at the same time a list of Abelard's supposed heresies, perhaps at Bernard's instigation. Bernard's complaint mainly is that Abelard has applied logic where it is not applicable, and that is illogical.

Amid pressure from Bernard, Abelard challenged Bernard either to withdraw his accusations, or to make them publicly at the important church council at Sens planned for 2 June 1141. In so doing, Abelard put himself into the position of the wronged party and forced Bernard to defend himself from the accusation of slander. Bernard avoided this trap, however: on the eve of the council, he called a private meeting of the assembled bishops and persuaded them to condemn, one by one, each of the heretical propositions he attributed to Abelard. When Abelard appeared at the council the next day, he was presented with a list of condemned propositions imputed to him.

Unable due to ill-health to respond to these propositions, Abelard left the assembly, appealed to the Pope, and set off for Rome, hoping that the Pope would be more supportive. However, this hope was unfounded. On 16 July 1141, Pope Innocent II issued a bull excommunicating Abelard and his followers and imposing perpetual silence on him, and in a second document he ordered Abelard to be confined in a monastery and his books to be burned. Abelard was saved from this sentence, however, by Peter the Venerable, abbot of Cluny. Abelard had stopped there, on his way to Rome, before the papal condemnation had reached France. Peter persuaded Abelard, already old, to give up his journey and stay at the monastery. Peter managed to arrange a reconciliation with Bernard, to have the sentence of excommunication lifted, and to persuade Innocent that it was enough if Abelard remained under the aegis of Cluny.

=== Death ===
Abelard spent his final months at the priory of St Marcel, near Chalon-sur-Saône, before he died on 21 April 1142. He is said to have uttered the last words "I don't know", before expiring. He died from a fever while suffering from a skin disorder, possibly mange or scurvy. Heloise and Peter of Cluny arranged after his death with the Pope to clear his name of heresy charges.

==== Disputed resting place and lovers' pilgrimage ====
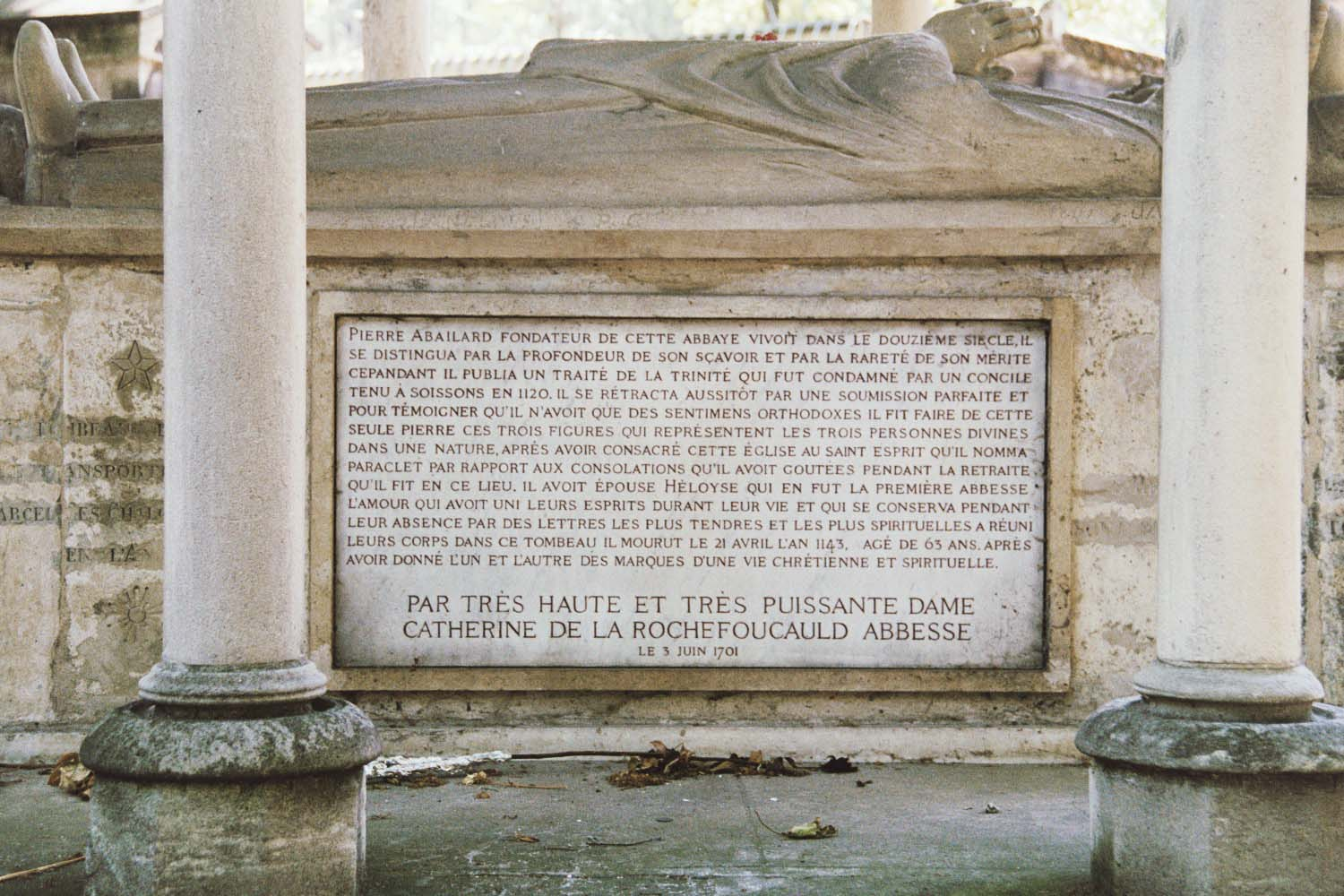
Dedicatory panel in the Père Lachaise Cemetery

Abelard was first buried at St. Marcel, but his remains were soon carried off secretly to the Paraclete, and given over to the loving care of Héloïse, who in time came herself to rest beside them in 1163.

The bones of the pair were moved more than once afterwards, but they were preserved even through the vicissitudes of the French Revolution, and now are presumed to lie in the well-known tomb in Père Lachaise Cemetery in eastern Paris. The transfer of their remains there in 1817 is considered to have considerably contributed to the popularity of that cemetery, at the time still far outside the built-up area of Paris. By tradition, lovers or lovelorn singles leave letters at the crypt, in tribute to the couple or in hope of finding true love.

This remains, however, disputed. The Oratory of the Paraclete claims Abelard and Héloïse are buried there and that what exists in Père-Lachaise is merely a monument, or cenotaph. According to Père-Lachaise, the remains of both lovers were transferred from the Oratory in the early 19th century and reburied in the famous crypt on their grounds. Others believe that while Abelard is buried in the tomb at Père-Lachaise, Heloïse's remains are elsewhere.

== Philosophy ==
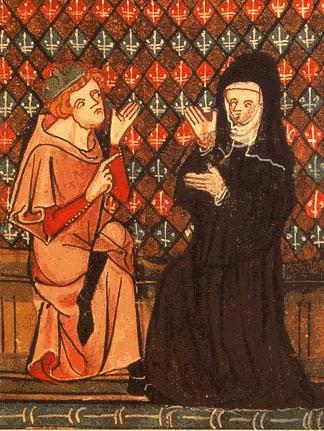
Peter Abelard and Heloïse in a manuscript of the Roman de la Rose (14th century)

Abelard is considered one of the founders of the secular university and pre-Renaissance secular philosophical thought.

Abelard argued for conceptualism in the theory of universals. (A universal is a quality or property which every individual member of a class of things must possess if the same word is to apply to all the things in that class. Blueness, for example, is a universal property possessed by all blue objects.) According to Abelard scholar David Luscombe, "Abelard logically elaborated an independent philosophy of language...[in which] he stressed that language itself is not able to demonstrate the truth of things (res) that lie in the domain of physics."

He helped establish the philosophical authority of Aristotle, which became firmly established in the half-century after his death. It was at this time that Aristotle's Organon first became available, and gradually all of Aristotle's other surviving works. Before this, the works of Plato formed the basis of support for philosophical realism.

=== Logic ===
Abelard has been praised as the greatest logician between the ancients and William of Ockham. Following Aristotle, he divided linguistic categories into nouns and verbs as the constituents of sentences, with his discussion centring on common nouns—the crux of the problem of universals. Influenced by his first teacher Roscelin, Abelard held that only nouns possess universality, a position for which he is credited as a founder of nominalism (the term itself deriving from the Latin nomen, "name"). His own position, however, was more moderate than later nominalist thought, and he is now generally classified as falling between nominalism and realism.

As part of his philosophy of language, Abelard developed a theory of propositional content that distinguished between the force and the content of propositions. The same propositional content may appear under different forces: an assertion ("Socrates is sitting") and a question ("Is Socrates sitting?") share the same content but differ in force. This distinction, long thought to have originated with Gottlob Frege in the 19th century, was in fact articulated by Abelard some seven hundred years earlier. He further held that conditionals do not assert the truth of either the antecedent or the consequent, but rather affirm the connection between the two propositions.

Abelard's account of inference, which has been translated as entailment, distinguishes between complete and incomplete forms. A complete entailment, such as a traditional Aristotelian categorical syllogism, is one in which the conclusion is contained in the premises and the inference survives uniform substitution. He required conclusions to be both relevant and necessary to their premises. An incomplete entailment holds when the conclusion follows but is not formally valid under uniform substitution—he gave the rule "a genus inherits its species' predicate" as an example. His ultimate conclusion that valid arguments and true conditionals need not correlate with each other proved controversial and prompted considerable debate among subsequent logicians.

=== Ethics ===
Abelard's two principal ethical works, both written late in life and possibly left incomplete, are Ethica (also known as Scito te ipsum, "Know Yourself") and the Dialogus inter Philosophum, Iudaeum et Christianum ("Dialogue Between a Philosopher, a Jew, and a Christian").

In the Ethica, Abelard develops an account of pure intentionalism, arguing that consent or intention alone is morally evaluable, not will or desire. Sin, he argues, consists in contempt of God, and a person who has resolved to commit a wrongful act but is prevented by external circumstances is as culpable as one who carries it out. He identifies eight components of behaviour and rejects mental vices—such as natural inclinations toward certain desires—as morally determining, since these are beyond the individual's control. To illustrate the distinction between involuntary physical response and consent, he offers the example of a man bound to a bed between two women: though aroused by the contact, the man has not consented to the situation. On the same grounds, Abelard rejects the view, held by some contemporaries, that pleasure is inherently sinful, arguing that God created human beings with the capacity for pleasure.

Abelard grounds virtue in the love of God and neighbour, with sin constituting contempt of God. A person who sincerely believes an action to be in accordance with God's will is not blameworthy, even if the action is objectively wrong—though performing the wrong action prevents one from being fully moral. This leads to one of his most controversial claims, developed in the Dialogus: the Jews who crucified Christ were blameless, because they genuinely believed they were executing a man who falsely claimed to be the Messiah. Their actions prevented full moral virtue, but their lack of knowledge absolved them of blame.

On voluntariness, Abelard departs from many ethicists by characterising immoral behaviour as irrational and thus not fully voluntary. A person who knowingly commits a wrong act while expecting punishment, he argues, is not acting rationally: the agent has a first-order desire to perform the act and a second-order desire not to want to perform it. Abelard terms this involuntary consent—the person remains morally culpable, but the consent is involuntary insofar as the agent does not will the consequences. Finally, Abelard holds that the external act itself is not essential to moral evaluation: the same act—such as a judge sentencing a murderer to death—may be laudable if motivated by justice or reprehensible if motivated by personal hatred.

== Theology ==
Abelard is considered one of the greatest twelfth-century Catholic theologians, arguing that God and the universe can and should be known via logic as well as via the emotions. He coined the term "theology" for the religious branch of philosophical tradition. He should not be read as a heretic, as his charges of heresy were dropped and rescinded by the Church after his death, but rather as a cutting-edge philosopher who pushed theology and philosophy to their limits. He is described as "the keenest thinker and boldest theologian of the 12th century" and as the greatest logician of the Middle Ages. "His genius was evident in all he did"; as the first to use 'theology' in its modern sense, he championed "reason in matters of faith", and "seemed larger than life to his contemporaries: his quick wit, sharp tongue, perfect memory, and boundless arrogance made him unbeatable in debate"--"the force of his personality impressed itself vividly on all with whom he came into contact."

Novelist and Abelard scholar George Moore referred to Abelard as the "first protestant" prior to Martin Luther. While Abelard conflicted with the Church to the point of (later cleared) heresy charges, he never denied his Catholic faith.

Regarding the unbaptized who die in infancy, Abelard — in Commentaria in Epistolam Pauli ad Romanos — emphasized the goodness of God and interpreted Augustine's "mildest punishment" as the pain of loss at being denied the beatific vision (carentia visionis Dei), without hope of obtaining it, but with no additional punishments. His thought contributed to the forming of Limbo of Infants theory in the 12th–13th centuries.

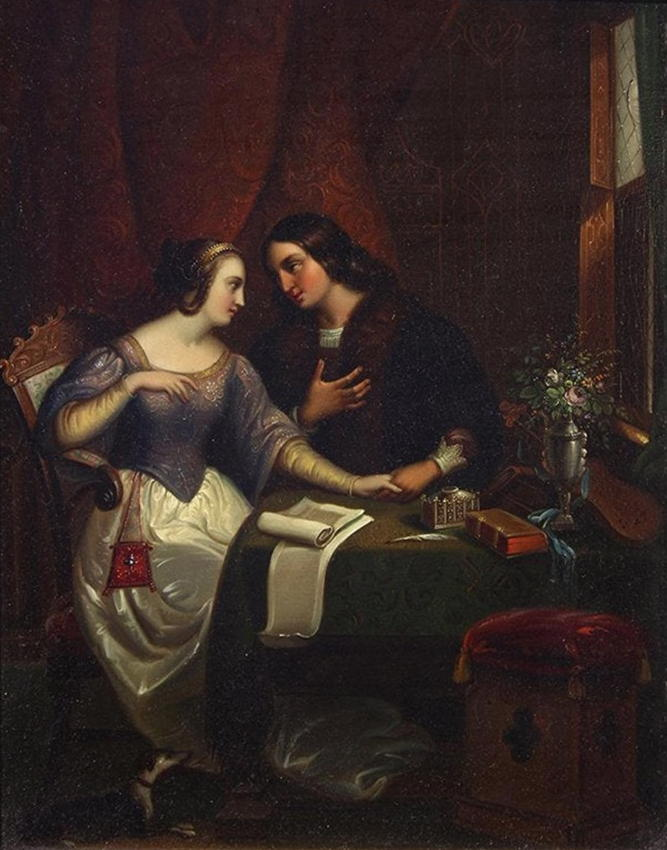
Jean-Baptiste Goyet, Héloïse et Abailard, oil on copper, c. 1829.

=== Comments from Pope Benedict XVI ===
During his general audience on 4 November 2009, Pope Benedict XVI talked about Saint Bernard of Clairvaux and Peter Abelard to illustrate differences in the monastic and scholastic approaches to theology in the 12th century. The Pope recalled that theology is the search for a rational understanding (if possible) of the mysteries of Christian revelation, which is believed through faith — faith that seeks intelligibility (fides quaerens intellectum). But St. Bernard, a representative of monastic theology, emphasized "faith" whereas Abelard, who is a scholastic, stressed "understanding through reason".

For Bernard of Clairvaux, faith is based on the testimony of Scripture and on the teaching of the Fathers of the Church. Thus, Bernard found it difficult to agree with Abelard and, in a more general way, with those who would subject the truths of faith to the critical examination of reason — an examination which, in his opinion, posed a grave danger: intellectualism, the relativizing of truth, and the questioning of the truths of faith themselves. Theology for Bernard could be nourished only in contemplative prayer, by the affective union of the heart and mind with God, with only one purpose: to promote the living, intimate experience of God; an aid to loving God ever more and ever better.

According to Pope Benedict XVI, an excessive use of philosophy rendered Abelard's doctrine of the Trinity fragile and, thus, his idea of God. In the field of morals, his teaching was vague, as he insisted on considering the intention of the subject as the only basis for describing the goodness or evil of moral acts, thereby ignoring the objective meaning and moral value of the acts, resulting in a dangerous subjectivism. But the Pope recognized the great achievements of Abelard, who made a decisive contribution to the development of scholastic theology, which eventually expressed itself in a more mature and fruitful way during the following century. And some of Abelard's insights should not be underestimated, for example, his affirmation that non-Christian religious traditions already contain some form of preparation for welcoming Christ.

Pope Benedict XVI concluded that Bernard's "theology of the heart" and Abelard's "theology of reason" represent the importance of healthy theological discussion and humble obedience to the authority of the Church, especially when the questions being debated have not been defined by the magisterium. St. Bernard, and even Abelard himself, always recognized without any hesitation the authority of the magisterium. Abelard showed humility in acknowledging his errors, and Bernard exercised great benevolence. The Pope emphasized, in the field of theology, there should be a balance between architectonic principles, which are given through Revelation and which always maintain their primary importance, and the interpretative principles proposed by philosophy (that is, by reason), which have an important function, but only as a tool. When the balance breaks down, theological reflection runs the risk of becoming marred by error; it is then up to the magisterium to exercise the needed service to truth, for which it is responsible.

== Psychology ==
Abelard was concerned with the concept of intent and inner life, developing an elementary theory of cognition in his Tractatus De Intellectibus, and later developing the concept that human beings "speak to God with their thoughts". He was one of the developers of the insanity defense, writing in Sito te ipsum, "Of this [sin], small children and of course insane people are untouched...lack[ing] reason....nothing is counted as sin for them". He spearheaded the idea that mental illness was a natural condition and "debunked the idea that the devil caused insanity", a point of view which Thomas F. Graham argues Abelard was unable to separate himself from objectively to argue more subtly "because of his own mental health."

== Personal life ==
=== Relationship with Héloïse ===
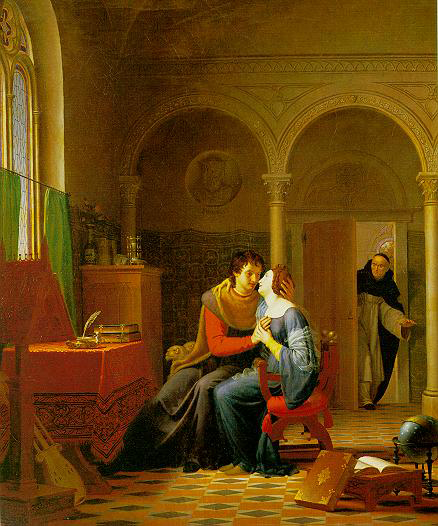
"Abaelardus and Heloïse surprised by Master Fulbert", by Romanticist painter Jean Vignaud (1819)

Héloïse d'Argenteuil lived within the precincts of Notre-Dame, under the care of her uncle, the secular canon Fulbert. She was famous as the most well-educated and intelligent woman in Paris, renowned for her knowledge of classical letters, including not only Latin but also Greek and Hebrew.

At the time Heloise met Abelard, he was surrounded by crowds — supposedly thousands of students — drawn from all countries by the fame of his teaching. Enriched by the offerings of his pupils, and entertained with universal admiration, he came to think of himself as the only undefeated philosopher in the world. But a change in his fortunes was at hand. In his devotion to science, he claimed to have lived a very straight and narrow life, enlivened only by philosophical debate: now, at the height of his fame, he encountered romance.

Upon deciding to pursue Héloïse, Abelard sought a place in Fulbert's house, and in 1115 or 1116 began an affair. While in his autobiography he describes the relationship as a seduction, Heloise's letters contradict this and instead depict a relationship of equals kindled by mutual attraction. Abelard boasted of his conquest using example phrases in his teaching such as "Peter loves his girl" and writing popular poems and songs of his love that spread throughout the country. Once Fulbert found out, he separated them, but they continued to meet in secret. Héloïse became pregnant and was sent by Abelard to be looked after by his family in Brittany, where she gave birth to a son, whom she named Astrolabe, name of the polyvalent astronomical instrument which scientists used to tell the time or the position of celestial bodies.

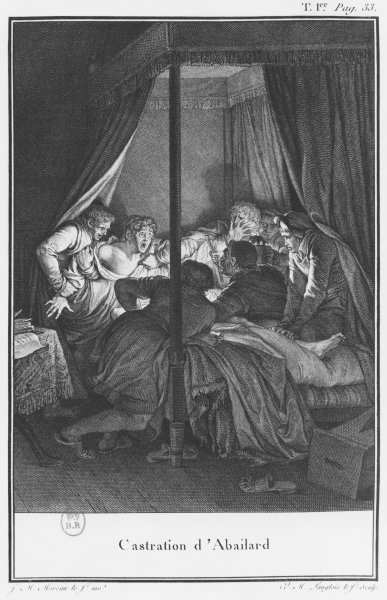
Abelard, attacked and castrated

To appease Fulbert, Abelard proposed a marriage. Héloïse initially opposed marriage, but to appease her worries about Abelard's career prospects as a married philosopher, the couple were married in secret. (At this time, clerical celibacy was becoming the standard at higher levels in the church orders.) To avoid suspicion of involvement with Abelard, Heloise continued to stay at the house of her uncle. When Fulbert publicly disclosed the marriage, Héloïse vehemently denied it, arousing Fulbert's wrath and abuse. Abelard rescued her by sending her to the convent at Argenteuil, where she had been brought up, to protect her from her uncle. Héloïse dressed as a nun and shared the nun's life, though she was not veiled.

Fulbert, infuriated that Heloise had been taken from his house and possibly believing that Abelard had disposed of her at Argenteuil in order to be rid of her, arranged for a band of men to break into Abelard's room one night and castrate him. In legal retribution for this vigilante attack, members of the band were punished, and Fulbert, scorned by the public, took temporary leave of his canon duties (he does not appear again in the Paris cartularies for several years).

In shame of his injuries, Abelard retired permanently as a Notre Dame canon, with any career as a priest or ambitions for higher office in the church shattered by his loss of manhood. He effectively hid himself as a monk at the monastery of St Denis, near Paris, avoiding the questions of his horrified public. Roscellinus and Fulk of Deuil ridiculed and belittled Abelard for being castrated.

Upon joining the monastery at St. Denis, Abelard insisted that Héloïse take vows as a nun (she had few other options at the time). Héloïse protested her separation from Abelard, sending numerous letters re-initiating their friendship and demanding answers to theological questions concerning her new vocation.

=== Children ===
Shortly after the birth of their child, Astrolabe, Heloise and Abelard were both cloistered. Their son was thus brought up by Abelard's sister (soror), Denise, at Abelard's childhood home in Le Pallet. His name derives from the astrolabe, an astronomical instrument said to elegantly model the universe and which was popularized in France by Adelard. He is mentioned in Abelard's poem to his son, the Carmen Astralabium, and by Abelard's protector, Peter the Venerable of Cluny, who wrote to Héloise: "I will gladly do my best to obtain a prebend in one of the great churches for your Astrolabe, who is also ours for your sake".

'Petrus Astralabius' is recorded at the Cathedral of Nantes in 1150, and the same name appears again later at the Cistercian abbey at Hauterive in what is now Switzerland. Given the extreme eccentricity of the name, it is almost certain these references refer to the same person. Astrolabe is recorded as dying in the Paraclete necrology on 29 or 30 October, year unknown, appearing as "Petrus Astralabius magistri nostri Petri filius".

=== Mental health ===
Abelard suffered at least two nervous collapses, the first around 1104–05, cited as due to the stresses of too much study. In his words: "Not long afterward, though, my health broke down under the strain of too much study and I had to return home to Brittany. I was away from France for several years, bitterly missed..." His second documented collapse took place in 1141 at the Council of Sens, where he was accused of heresy and was unable to speak in reply. In the words of Geoffrey of Auxerre: his "memory became very confused, his reason blacked out and his interior sense forsook him."

Medieval understanding of mental health precedes development of modern psychiatric diagnosis. No diagnosis besides "ill health" was applied to Abelard at the time. His tendencies towards self-acclaim, grandiosity, paranoia and shame are suggestive of possible latent narcissism (despite his great talents and fame), or—recently conjectured—in keeping with his breakdowns, overwork, loquaciousness and belligerence – mood-related mental health issues such as mania related to bipolar disorder.

At the time, some of these characteristics were attributed disparagingly to his Breton heritage, his difficult "indomitable" personality and overwork.

== Works ==
=== List of works ===
- Logica ingredientibus ("Logic for Advanced") completed before 1121
- Petri Abaelardi Glossae in Porphyrium ("The Glosses of Peter Abailard on Porphyry"), c. 1120
- Dialectica, before 1125 (1115–1116 according to John Marenbon, The Philosophy of Peter Abelard, Cambridge University Press 1997).
- Logica nostrorum petitioni sociorum ("Logic in response to the request of our comrades"), c. 1124–1125
- Tractatus de intellectibus ("A treatise on understanding"), written before 1128.
- Sic et Non ("Yes and No") (A list of quotations from Christian authorities on philosophical and theological questions)
- Theologia 'Summi Boni', Theologia christiana, and Theologia 'scholarium'. His main work on systematic theology, written between 1120 and 1140, and which appeared in a number of versions under a number of titles (shown in chronological order)
- Dialogus inter philosophum, Judaeum, et Christianum, (Dialogue of a Philosopher with a Jew and a Christian) 1136–1139.
- Ethica or Scito Te Ipsum ("Ethics" or "Know Yourself"), before 1140.

==== The letters of Abelard and Héloïse ====
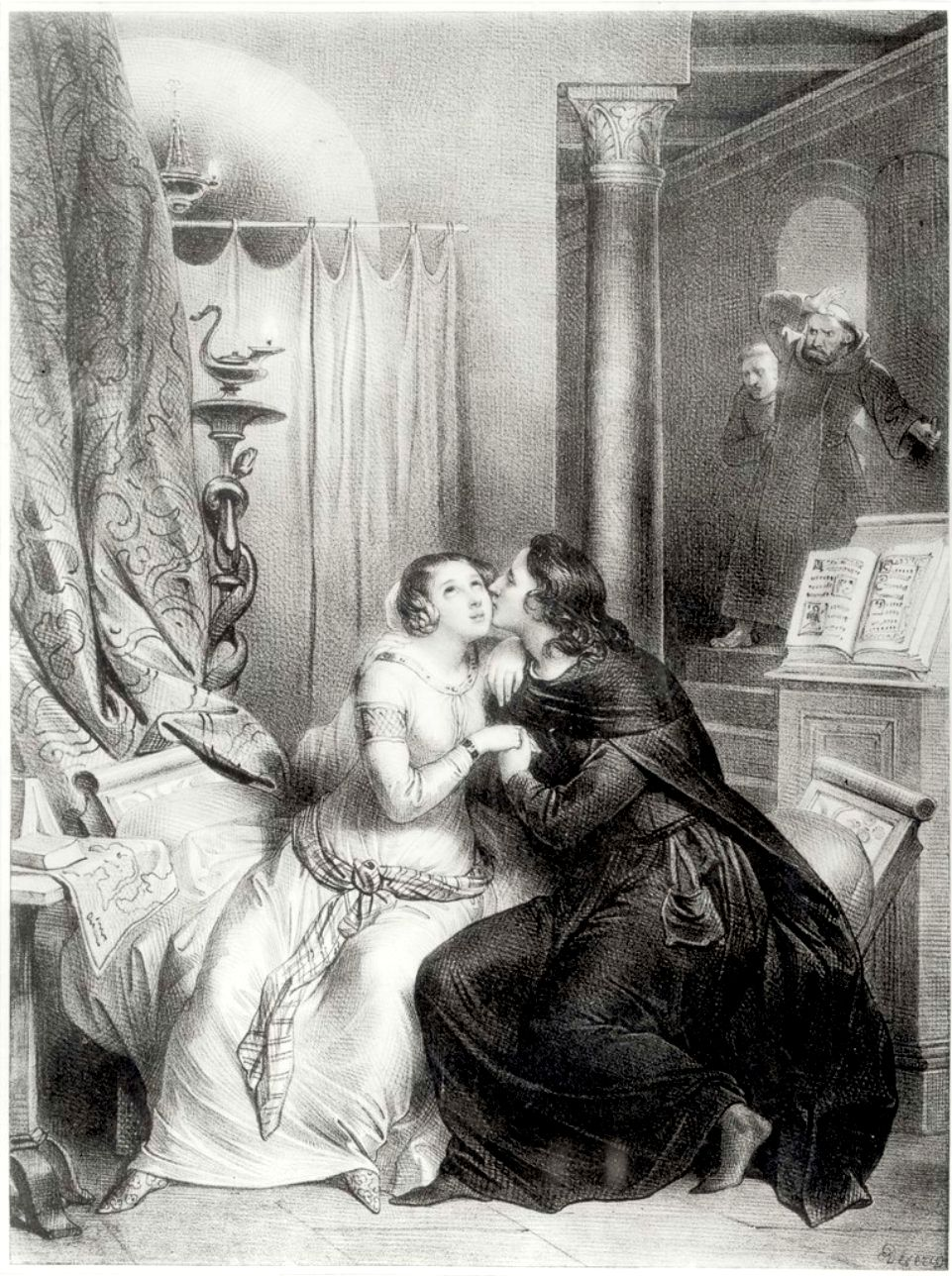
Heloise and Abelard, Achille Devaria, 19th c. engraving

The story of Abelard and Héloïse has proved immensely popular in modern European culture. This story is known almost entirely from a few sources: first, the Historia Calamitatum; secondly, the seven letters between Abelard and Héloïse which survive (three written by Abelard, and four by Héloïse), and always follow the Historia Calamitatum in the manuscript tradition; thirdly, four letters between Peter the Venerable and Héloïse (three by Peter, one by Héloïse). They are, in modern times, the best known and most widely translated parts of Abelard's work.

It is unclear quite how the letters of Abelard and Héloïse came to be preserved. There are brief and factual references to their relationship by 12th-century writers including William Godel and Walter Map. While the letters were most likely exchanged by horseman in a public (open letter) fashion readable by others at stops along the way (and thus explaining Heloise's interception of the Historia), it seems unlikely that the letters were widely known outside of their original travel range during the period. Rather, the earliest manuscripts of the letters are dated to the late 13th century. It therefore seems likely that the letters sent between Abelard and Héloïse were kept by Héloïse at the Paraclete along with the 'Letters of Direction', and that more than a century after her death they were brought to Paris and copied.

Shortly after the deaths of Abelard and Heloise, Chrétien de Troyes appears influenced by Heloise's letters and Abelard's castration in his depiction of the fisher king in his grail tales. In the fourteenth century, the story of their love affair was summarised by Jean de Meun in the Le Roman de la Rose. Chaucer makes a brief reference in the Wife of Bath's Prologue (lines 677–8) and may base his character of the wife partially on Heloise. Petrarch owned an early 14th-century manuscript of the couple's letters (and wrote detailed approving notes in the margins).

The first Latin publication of the letters was in Paris in 1616, simultaneously in two editions. These editions gave rise to numerous translations of the letters into European languages – and consequent 18th- and 19th-century interest in the story of the medieval lovers. In the 18th century, the couple were revered as tragic lovers, who endured adversity in life but were united in death. With this reputation, they were the only individuals from the pre-Revolutionary period whose remains were given a place of honour at the newly founded cemetery of Père Lachaise in Paris. At this time, they were effectively revered as romantic saints; for some, they were forerunners of modernity, at odds with the ecclesiastical and monastic structures of their day and to be celebrated more for rejecting the traditions of the past than for any particular intellectual achievement.

The Historia was first published in 1841 by John Caspar Orelli of Turici. Then, in 1849, Victor Cousin published Petri Abaelardi opera, in part based on the two Paris editions of 1616 but also based on the reading of four manuscripts; this became the standard edition of the letters. Soon after, in 1855, Migne printed an expanded version of the 1616 edition under the title Opera Petri Abaelardi, without the name of Héloïse on the title page.

Critical editions of the Historia Calamitatum and the letters were subsequently published in the 1950s and 1960s. The most well-established documents, and correspondingly those whose authenticity has been disputed the longest, are the series of letters that begin with the Historia Calamitatum (counted as letter 1) and encompass four "personal letters" (numbered 2–5) and "letters of direction" (numbers 6–8).

Most scholars today accept these works as having been written by Héloïse and Abelard themselves. John Benton is the most prominent modern skeptic of these documents. Etienne Gilson, Peter Dronke, and Constant Mews maintain the mainstream view that the letters are genuine, arguing that the skeptical viewpoint is fueled in large part by pre-conceived notions.

==== Lost love letters ====
More recently, it has been argued that an anonymous series of letters, the Epistolae Duorum Amantium, were in fact written by Héloïse and Abelard during their initial romance (and, thus, before the later and more broadly known series of letters). This argument has been advanced by Constant J. Mews, based on earlier work by Ewad Könsgen. These letters represent a significant expansion to the corpus of surviving writing by Héloïse, and thus open several new directions for further scholarship. However, because the attribution "is of necessity based on circumstantial rather than on absolute evidence," it is not accepted by all scholars.

=== Poetry and music ===
Abelard was also long known as an important poet and composer. He composed some celebrated love songs for Héloïse that are now lost, and which have not been identified in the anonymous repertoire. (One known romantic poem / possible lyric remains, "Dull is the Star".) Héloïse praised these songs in a letter: "The great charm and sweetness in language and music, and a soft attractiveness of the melody obliged even the unlettered". His education in music was based in his childhood learning of the traditional quadrivium studied at the time by almost all aspiring medieval scholars.

Abelard composed a hymnbook for the religious community that Héloïse joined. This hymnbook, written after 1130, differed from contemporary hymnals, such as that of Bernard of Clairvaux, in that Abelard used completely new and homogeneous material. The songs were grouped by metre, which meant that it was possible to use comparatively few melodies. Only one melody from this hymnal survives, O quanta qualia.

Abelard also wrote six biblical planctus (laments):

- Planctus Dinae filiae Iacob; inc.: Abrahae proles Israel nata (Planctus I)
- Planctus Iacob super filios suos; inc.: Infelices filii, patri nati misero (Planctus II)
- Planctus virginum Israel super filia Jepte Galadite; inc.: Ad festas choreas celibes (Planctus III)
- Planctus Israel super Samson; inc.: Abissus vere multa (Planctus IV)
- Planctus David super Abner, filio Neronis, quem Ioab occidit; inc.: Abner fidelissime (Planctus V)
- Planctus David super Saul et Jonatha; inc.: Dolorum solatium (Planctus VI).

In surviving manuscripts these pieces have been notated in diastematic neumes which resist reliable transcription. Only Planctus VI was fixed in square notation. Planctus as genre influenced the subsequent development of the lai, a song form that flourished in northern Europe in the 13th and 14th centuries.

Melodies that have survived have been praised as "flexible, expressive melodies [that] show an elegance and technical adroitness that are very similar to the qualities that have been long admired in Abelard's poetry."

=== Modern editions and translations ===
- Abelard, Peter (1995). Peter Abelard: Ethical Writings. Translated by Spade, P.V. Indianapolis: Hackett.
- "Logica Ingredientibus, Commentary of Porphyry's Isagoge". Five Texts on the Medieval Problem of Universals: Porphyry, Boethius, Abelard, Duns Scotus, Ockham. Translated by Spade, P.V. Indianapolis: Hackett. 1994.
- Abelard & Héloïse: The Letters and other Writings. Translated by Levitan, William (introduction and notes by William Levitan ed.). 2007. ISBN 978-0-87220-875-9.
- Radice, Betty (1974). The Letters of Abelard and Héloïse. London: Penguin Books. ISBN 978-0-14-044297-7.
- Abelard, Peter and Heloise. (2009) The Letters of Heloise and Abelard. Translated by Mary McGlaughlin and Bonnie Wheeler.
- Planctus. Consolatoria, Confessio fidei, by M. Sannelli, La Finestra editrice, Lavis 2013, ISBN 978-8895925-47-9
- Carmen Ad Astralabium, in: Ruys J.F. (2014) Carmen ad Astralabium—English Translation. The Repentant Abelard. The New Middle Ages. Palgrave Macmillan, New York. https://doi.org/10.1057/9781137051875_5

== See also ==
- Peter the Venerable
- Bernard of Clairvaux
- Astrolabe
- Stealing Heaven

== Sources ==
- Burge, James (2006). Héloïse & Abelard: A New Biography. HarperOne. pp. 276–277. ISBN 978-0-06-081613-1.
- Marenbon, John (2004). "Life, milieu and intellectual contexts". In Brower, Jeffrey E; Guilfoy, Kevin (eds.). 'The Cambridge Companion to Abelard. Cambridge University Press. pp. 14–17.
- The Letters of Abelard and Héloïse. Translated by Radice, Betty. Penguin. 1947.
- Robertson, George Croom; Shotwell, James Thomson (1911). "Abelard, Peter" . In Chisholm, Hugh (ed.). Encyclopædia Britannica (11th ed.). Cambridge University Press. p. 40.
