= CSHR =

CSHR may refer to:

- Canadian Seminar on the History of Rhetoric
- Car Seat Headrest
