= ISHR =

ISHR can stand for:

- International Service for Human Rights
- International Society for Heart Research
- International Society for the History of Rhetoric
- International Society for Human Rights
