= Middle Ages in film =

Portrayal of the medieval era through film

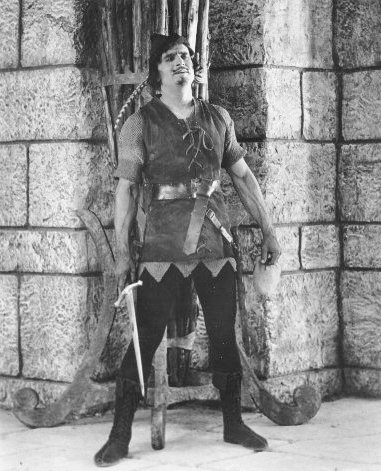
Douglas Fairbanks as Robin Hood in Douglas Fairbanks in Robin Hood (1922)

Medieval films imagine and portray the Middle Ages through the visual, audio and thematic forms of cinema.

== Background ==
Depictions of the Middle Ages have a long history, before the 20th century's film adaptations. The Middle Ages ended over five centuries ago and each century has portrayed the Middle Ages through painting, architecture, poetry, music and literature. In the 20th century, film has defined medieval history perhaps more so than any other medium. While the conclusions of academic research and findings of archeology have advanced knowledge of the Middle Ages, nothing has had more widespread influence on more people than the images created by film. Just as most people's perceptions of the American Wild West were drawn from cinema versus source material or academic research, so too most people's perceptions of the Middle Ages were influenced by the powerful narratives and images of film.

Hollywood had a significant impact on the popular "image" of the Middle Ages. Hollywood films reached a global audience through big budget productions and distribution and advertising channels. Hollywood adapted works of the Romanticism movement to the screen, seamlessly forging a bridge between Romanticized historical novels, operas, paintings, and music of the 19th century onto film in the 20th. The ideals of the Romantics were fully realized on the screen in such influential works as Ivanhoe (1952) and El Cid (1961) which belong to the same late Romantic culture in their music, imagery and themes.

Strong cinematic images of the Middle Ages can be found in European films. Influential European films included Fritz Lang's two-film series Die Nibelungen: Siegfrieds Tod and Die Nibelungen: Kriemhilds Rache (1924), Sergei Eisenstein's Alexander Nevsky (1938) and Ingmar Bergman's The Seventh Seal (1957), while in France there were many versions of the story of Joan of Arc.

The first medieval film was also one of the earliest films ever made, Jeanne d'Arc, which released in 1900. The first Robin Hood film dates to 1907 and was called Robin Hood and His Merry Men.

== Historiography ==
The historiography and historiophoty of medieval film originated in the late 20th century. In the last decade of the 20th century, medievalists began to pay attention to film as a serious means of learning about the Middle Ages. As Arthur Lindley said in 1998: "One could note the absence of books by medievalists as well as books of any kind devoted to medieval film... the situation may be beginning to change.". This change took place in part by the recognition of the complex relationship between historiography and cinematic history, since the publication of works such as Norman Cantor's Inventing the Middle Ages in 1991 demonstrated the extent of the influence of historiography on medieval history. Harnessing the work of the earlier New Historicism, this emergent field of historiography began to challenge the hegemony of medieval historians over the history which they narrate, and opens the door for new modes of thinking by the proposition that "we cannot interpret medieval culture, or any historical culture, except through the prism of the dominant concepts of our own thought worlds."

Until the publication of Kevin J. Harty's book The Reel Middle Ages (1999) there had been no comprehensive survey of medieval films, and John Aberth's book A Knight at the Movies (2003) can probably be called the first book in English dedicated solely to the subject of history and medieval history on film. One year later, in 2004, the eminent French historian François Amy de la Bretèque published his L'Imaginaire médiéval dans le cinéma occidental, in which he proposes a number of useful theories to finally break out of the circle of historiography vs historiophoty. One of the most pervasive of these, and one picked up in Robert Rosenstone's History on Film/Film on History (2006) is that both History and Film are ways of narrating the past, both equally susceptible in theory (though not in practice) to perversion. As Rosenstone observes, "we always violate the past, even as we attempt to preserve its memory in whatever medium we use... Yet this violation is inevitable, part of the price of our attempts at understanding the vanished world of our forebears."

== Middle Ages in modern film ==
Contemporary films continue to be inspired by the Middle Ages and Arthurian legends, such as A Knight's Tale that combines the Middle Ages with modern anachronisms and The Green Knight (film).

A large market in modern film is medieval fantasy, which takes heavy inspiration from the folklore and setting of the Middle Ages. Notable films include franchises like The Lord of the Rings (film) and The Chronicles of Narnia: The Lion, the Witch and the Wardrobe.

== Select films ==
At over 900 films listed by Harty in 1999, it is beyond the scope of this article to create a complete list. Listed here are some of the best and most significant films in both quality and historical accuracy as determined by a consensus poll of medieval students and teachers at Fordham University.

Date	Era	Title	IMDB	Country	Notes
1928	1431	The Passion of Joan of Arc		France	Joan of Arc. The film was so powerful that it was initially banned in Britain.
1938	12th c.	The Adventures of Robin Hood		USA	Prince John and the Norman Lords begin oppressing the Saxon masses in King Richard's absence, a Saxon lord fights back as the outlaw leader of a rebel guerrilla army.
1938	13th c.	Alexander Nevsky		USSR	Russians defend against invading German Teutonic Knights during the Northern Crusades of the 13th century.
1957	13th / 14th c.	The Seventh Seal		Sweden	About a knight returning from a crusade who plays a chess game with Death during the Black Plague.
1960	13th c.	The Virgin Spring		Sweden	Story of Christian medieval Swedish family whose daughter is raped by vagabonds.
1961	11th c.	El Cid		USA	Epic film of the legendary Spanish hero.
1964	12th c.	Becket		UK	Based on Jean Anouilh's play about Archbishop of Canterbury Thomas Becket and King Henry II of England.
1965	11th c.	The War Lord		USA	Based on Leslie Stevens' The Lovers. Charlton Heston is a knight invoking the "right" to sleep with another man's bride on their wedding night.
1966	15th c.	Andrei Rublev		USSR	Life of Andrei Rublev the great 15th-century Russian icon painter.
1968	12th c.	The Lion in Winter		UK	King Henry II's three sons all want to inherit the throne. His sons and wife Eleanor of Aquitaine variously plot. Based ten years after the events of the Revolt of 1173-1174.
1976	7th c.	Mohammad, Messenger of God		UK/Lebanon	Also known as The Message. Tagline: The Story of Islam.
1986	14th c.	The Name of the Rose		France/Italy/Germany	Based on the novel by Umberto Eco.
1988	14th c.	The Navigator: A Medieval Odyssey		New Zealand	Seeking relief from the Black Death, guided by a boy's vision, people dig a tunnel from 14th-century England to 20th-century New Zealand.

== See also ==
- Middle Ages in history
- List of films based on Arthurian legend
- List of films and television series featuring Robin Hood
- Joan of Arc in film
