= Donald Cary Williams =

American philosopher

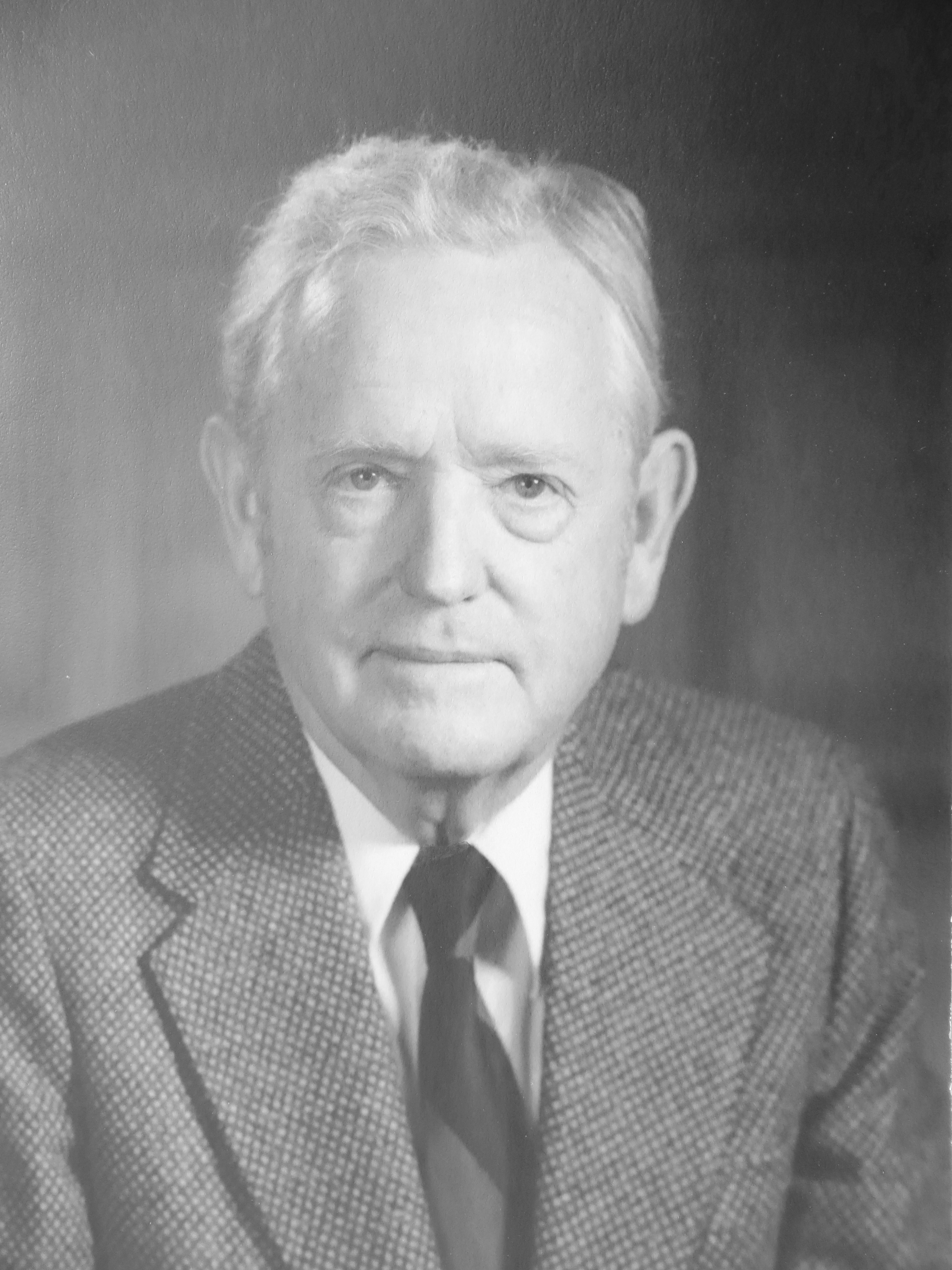
- Born: 28 May 1899; Crows Landing, California, U.S.
- Died: 16 January 1983 (aged 83); Fallbrook, California, U.S.
- Spouse: Katherine Pressly Adams (m. 1928)
- Awards: Guggenheim Fellowship for Humanities, US & Canada (1937)

Education
- Education: Occidental College (AB, 1923); Harvard University (AM, 1925); Harvard University (PhD, 1928)
- Thesis: A Metaphysical Interpretation of Behaviorism (1928)
- Doctoral advisor: Ralph Barton Perry

Philosophical work
- Era: Contemporary philosophy
- Region: Western philosophy
- School: Analytic philosophy
- Institutions: UCLA; Harvard University
- Doctoral students: Roderick Chisholm; Donald Davidson; Nicholas Wolterstorff
- Notable students: David Lewis
- Main interests: Metaphysics, epistemology, induction, logic, philosophy of mind
- Notable ideas: Trope theory, empirical realism, the reliability of statistical sampling as a solution to the problem of induction

Signature
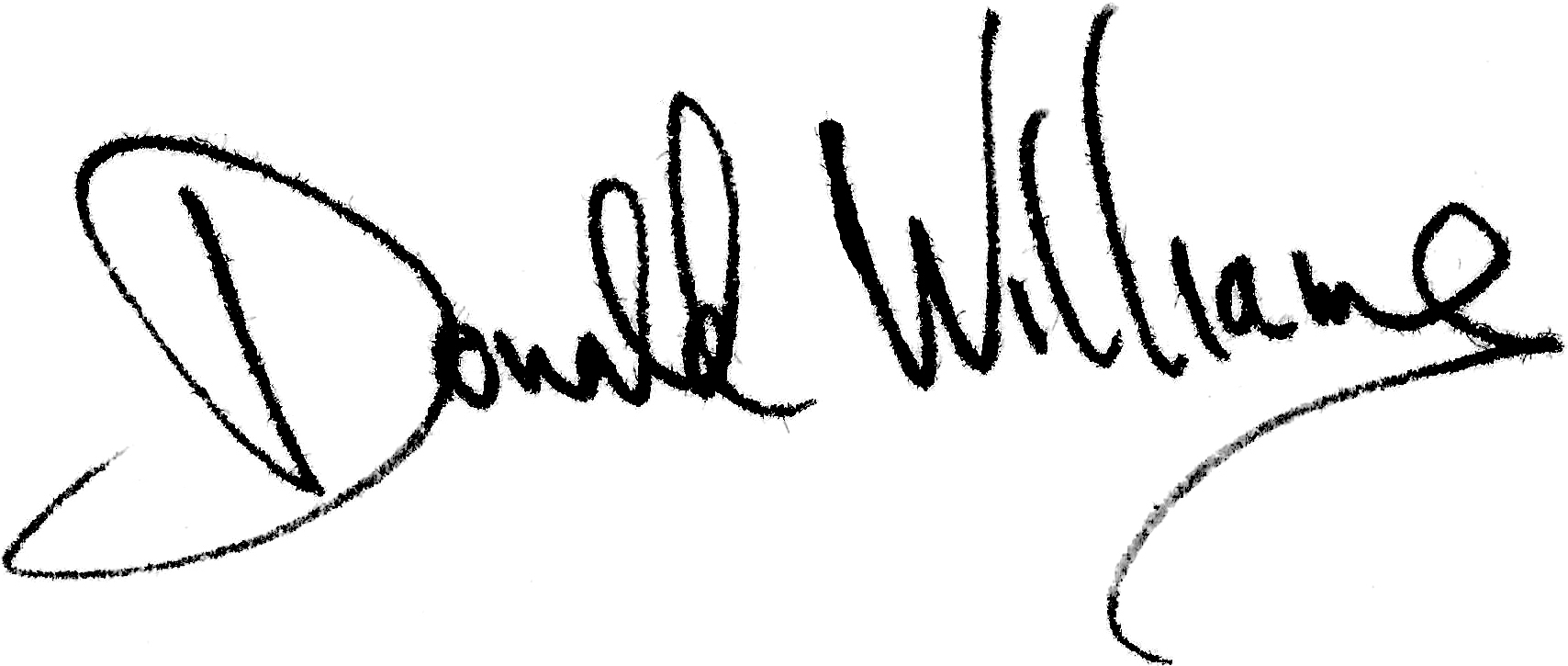

Donald Cary Williams (28 May 1899 – 16 January 1983), usually cited as D. C. Williams, was an American philosopher and a professor at both the University of California Los Angeles (from 1930 to 1938) and at Harvard University (from 1939 to 1967).

== Life ==
Williams was born in Crows Landing, California in 1899. As a teenager he was greatly interested in classics, English literature, poetry, and science fiction. He was a lifelong fan of the works of William Shakespeare, Mark Twain, and H. G. Wells. He studied English at Occidental College, California, and then English and Philosophy at Harvard University where he received an AM in Philosophy in 1925. He continued to study Philosophy and Psychology at UC-Berkeley. One of his teachers there was Jacob Loewenberg, and one of his peers was Arthur E. Murphy. In 1927 he returned to Harvard and obtained his PhD under the supervision of Ralph Barton Perry. He submitted his thesis – titled A Metaphysical Interpretation of Behaviorism – on 1 April 1928. In that same year he married Katherine Pressly Adams, who he knew from his time at UC-Berkeley. They had two sons: Donald Jr. and David. Williams was awarded a Sheldon Traveling Fellowship and studied philosophy in France and Germany, 1928–29.

Upon his return to the United States he was an instructor at Harvard in 1929 and then an instructor at UCLA in 1930. He stayed for several years at UCLA, becoming Assistant Professor and associate professor. In 1938 he was awarded a Guggenheim Foundation Fellowship for the project Studies in Empirical Realism. This was the culmination of a research programme he had embarked on as part of the flourishing of realism started by Bertrand Russell, G. E. Moore, Samuel Alexander, the New Realists, and Critical Realists. In 1939 he was a Visiting Lecturer at Harvard; then Associate Professor and eventually Professor. He spent the rest of his career at Harvard, arguing for realism, constructing a trope ontology, and advocating a four-dimensionalist theory of time, among many other things such as defending the legitimacy of inductive inference. As a teacher he lectured for several decades mostly on metaphysics and the history of philosophy, influencing many students who went on to have successful careers and make an impact on analytic philosophy such as Roderick Chisholm, Nicholas Wolterstorff, and David Lewis. He retired from Harvard in 1967 to Fallbrook, California where he continued to write philosophy, maintain his correspondence, read papers at universities in California and elsewhere, and host philosophical friends. He died in 1983.

== Work ==
Williams wrote on a wide range of philosophical topics, namely, metaphysics, epistemology, philosophy of mind, philosophy of language, logic, philosophy of science, probability theory, induction, philosophy of history, ethics, and history of philosophy. In what follows, only his more significant and influential contributions are surveyed.

=== Empiricism and realism ===
Williams thinks the goal of empiricism is to describe and explain the 'foreground of experience' and to 'intelligibly and credibly construct our account of the rest of the world'. The traditional understanding of empiricism, going back to John Locke, accepts the foreground of experience as the ground from which we construct our concepts and confirm certain conclusions that inform us of the rest of the world, especially other parts that are not experienced.

According to Williams, empiricism says that a posteriori knowledge is known inductively. He further thought that induction is not restricted to experience and its content or restricted to science. Induction has 'ontological reach' to things in themselves. This means that empiricism and realism are compatible. He thus endorsed ‘empirical realism’. He describes empirical realism as follows:

Our "empirical realism" is realistic in the most venerable sense, that it affirms there is valid knowledge of the nature and existence of a world distinct from our perceptions and independent of them, and a fortiori distinct from and independent of our thought and speech about it, and yet empiricistic in the classical sense that it affirms that all knowledge, including this, consists of conceptual constructions collected from and confirmed by sensory experience.

=== Induction and probability ===
He also published a book on the problem of induction, The Ground of Induction (1947), which argued that the reliability of statistical sampling solves Hume's skepticism about induction. He argued that inference from the past to the future, or more generally from the observed to the unobserved, should be seen in terms of inferring from sample to population; for example, inferring that because 48% of a sample of voters vote Democrat, probably about 48% of all voters vote Democrat. This inference is (probabilistically) justified, Williams said, by the necessary mathematical truth that the vast majority of large samples of a population approximately match the population in composition. Thus (unless there is definite evidence to the contrary) the population probably approximately matches the sample in proportion.

=== Metaphysics: ontology ===
For Williams, ontology is the study of the categories of being. The subject matter of ontology is traditionally examined using an analytic mode of inquiry. An analysis of some X is in terms of X's parts, whatever X might be. Analysis gets us the nature of X. Analysis in this sense is the classic decompositional sense, giving explanatory priority to parts over wholes. Analytic ontology is one branch of metaphysics.

A main issue in analytic ontology is the distinction between object and property. An object can have many properties. A property can be had by many objects. This chair has the property of being red, being made of wood, being hard, etc. This chair and every other chair in this room (say) all have the one property: being red. The first case has to do with predication. The second has to do with resemblance, and in particular, with resemblance among ordinary objects in intrinsic respects.

In 'The Elements of Being', Williams points out that the fact that two red chairs resemble each other with respect to colour is explained in terms of the fact that each chair has a certain kind of part or aspect that exactly resembles each other. The 'red-part' of this chair and the 'red-part' of that chair exactly resemble each other and this grounds the fact that each chair resembles the other with respect to colour. These 'parts' are 'fine', 'thin', or abstract in a certain sense, the sense that is associated with the idea that an abstract entity is a certain kind of part of a whole. These parts are also particulars. And they are particular as each chair. Hence they are abstract particulars, which Williams dubbed 'tropes'. Such an analysis explains resemblance among ordinary objects in intrinsic respects.

The red-part of this chair plays the role of being a property, a property had by the chair. It does this because in order for the property being red to be 'of' the chair it must be an abstract part of the chair and it must 'manifest' Redness, i.e., manifest its kind. This chair, in fact, is nothing more than its abstract parts or tropes. This chair is a certain mereological sum of tropes, namely, the sum that 'concurs' in a single region of spacetime. Such an analysis explains how an object can have many properties – it does so in virtue of it having several tropes as abstract parts.

One benefit of Williams's trope theory is that objective resemblance among ordinary objects in intrinsic respects is explained without positing universals as members of a primitive category of being. Another benefit is that his theory explains facts about predication without positing substances as members of a primitive category of being. Williams posits tropes as members of a fundamental category of being and then derives the category of universality and substance from tropes. Abstract particulars ground concrete particulars and abstract universals. This makes his theory a one-category ontology. Tropes comprise the one fundamental category of being. Keith Campbell carries this argument forward in Abstract Particulars (1990).

There are several objections in the literature against Williams's trope theory. And there are just as many philosophers who defend and develop the view. Contentious issues include the individuation of tropes, the nature of the concurrence relation that unifies tropes into concrete objects, the nature of the resemblance relation, the nature of universals, Williams's account of predication, the simplicity of tropes (whether a basic trope is really a simple entity). And much more. These issues are part of on-going disputes in metaphysics.

The main argument for trope theory is that it is the most ontically parsimonious hypothesis with the greatest explanatory power. As Williams remarks, he found trope theory 'so serviceable that it may well be true'. It posits one category of being but at the same time explains the distinction between object and property, explains objective resemblance among ordinary objects in intrinsic respects, and explains facts about predication (of concrete particulars). Trope can also play the role of events and truthmakers and serve as the contents of mental acts such as perception and play the role of mental acts and states themselves. His trope theory remains a strong candidate for being the best explanation we have in analytic ontology. See also the Stanford Encyclopedia of Philosophy entry on Williams.

=== Metaphysics: cosmology ===
Cosmology is the study of the contents of the world and how its contents are related to each other in the loosest sense. Typically, cosmology is studied from a speculative perspective, that is, a constructive perspective that involves inductively inferring the probable truth of a certain world hypothesis based on various pieces of evidence. For Williams, time and space fall under the study of cosmology. Speculative cosmology is the other branch of metaphysics, along with analytic ontology. As D.M. Armstrong notes, this distinction between analytic ontology and speculative cosmology is a division within metaphysics. As such, ontology does not exhaust metaphysics.

Because Williams is an empiricist he thinks science can inform metaphysics, especially cosmology, as characterised above. He also thinks logic as well as common sense tell us something about time and our concept of time. He notes that science and logic and the canonical logic of science do not have any temporal reference. When a scientist proposes a law of nature or a scientific generalisation the scientist proposes a statement that holds regardless of temporal reference to a certain time or to the fact that a certain time is now. Similarly, in logic, arguments are presented without temporal reference. They are intended to be timeless. In common sense talk we readily say that we have a future and have a past. He writes: 'We also say "Isaiah is one of the great spiritual heroes" and "There is a meeting of the Dorcas Society tomorrow", although Isaiah is dead and the society has not met yet'.

For Williams, the present is not ontically privileged. The past, present, and future are equally real. Things in the past are just as real as things in the present and the future. Time is just another mode of extent like the dimensions of space. And things are spread out in time just as much as they are spread out in space. So he thinks, objects persist through time by having temporal parts at different times. In this respect, he is a perdurantist. Lastly, Williams thinks events are temporally related by earlier than/later than relations in a four-dimensional manifold. Following Russell and McTaggart, Williams endorses a B-theory of time. Reality is fundamentally tenseless and tensed concepts and terms like 'now' and 'present' are merely indexical. His preferred label for this theory of time is the 'pure manifold theory of time'.

The pure manifold theory of time is subject to many objections. In 'The Sea Fight Tomorrow', Williams counters the objection that the future is open in an important sense and that because of the openness of the future the pure manifold theory of time is wrong. He argues that although things in the future are determinate or definite in one sense this does not imply that things in the future are determined. It is not the case that contingent statements about the future are somehow indeterminate or without truth-values. In 'The Myth of Passage', Williams confronts the objection that time passes in an important sense and because of the passage of time the pure manifold theory of time leaves something out about the nature of time and so is wrong. He argues that any appeal to temporal experience or a direct phenomenological intuition of time's passage is bogus. Any sense we have of time's passage can be explained in terms of the B-theoretic distribution of content in the four-dimensional manifold. On his view, there is no absolute or pure temporal becoming.

In other work, recently published, he explains how the pure manifold theory of time can account for the metaphysical possibility of time travel. He further explains in what sense we can accept that there is a passage of time and how we can explain the arrow of time. The crux of his hypothesis is that facts about the B-theoretical distribution of content at the fundamental level of the four-dimensional manifold can do the necessary work in our explanation of the passage and arrow of time. His pure manifold theory of time is the first defence and detailed explication of a four-dimensional metaphysics of time in analytic metaphysics. The view continues to be defended in the literature and is a leading contender in the metaphysics of time.

== Influence ==
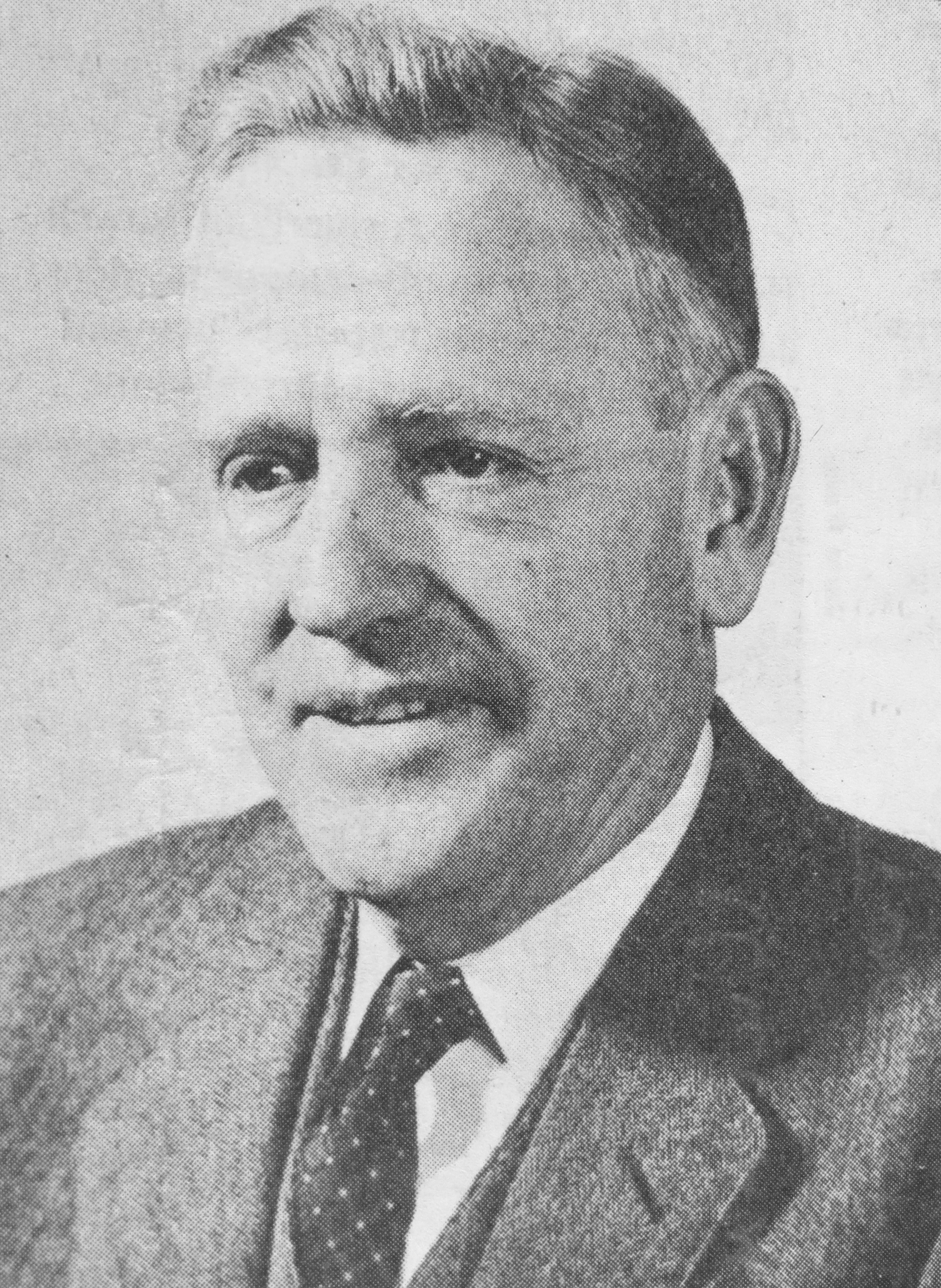
Donald C. Williams, 11 March 1960

Williams was at the height of his career in the 1940s and 1950s. During this period the type of metaphysics he pursued was unpopular and ridiculed by logical positivism, ordinary language philosophy, and the later Wittgenstein. He was among a select few whose work in metaphysics persisted and made an impact on later philosophers. In addition, he fought back on various occasions – first against logical positivism and its verificationist theory of meaning and conventionalism about the a priori, and second against Wittgensteinian critiques of metaphysics. In other places he just scoffed at the ordinary language suggestion that problems about the world can be dissolved by studying the meaning and use of words. He once wrote: 'It is hard enough to keep one's face straight at any of those readings of philosophical fortunes from the tea leaves of language which our British cousins call "logic" nowadays, but when one knows that the very leaves have been rigged, it is time to lodge a protest, good manners be hanged'. For a number of reasons the fortunes of metaphysics turned around in the second half of the twentieth century. One reason is due to the influence of Williams's work and instruction.

In the late 1960s and 1970s his work was studied closely at the University of Sydney by such philosophers as D. M. Armstrong, John Bacon, Keith Campbell, and David Stove. These philosophers took what Williams had to say seriously. Armstrong writes: 'It so happens that Sydney University was for some years the world centre of Donald Williams studies'. Armstrong appreciated and implemented Williams's conception of metaphysics and his distinction between analytic ontology and speculative cosmology in his theory of universals. Bacon and Campbell embraced Williams's trope theory, expanding on the ontology and ensuring it remained a strong contender in the literature. Armstrong himself in later work came to realize the explanatory power of trope theory, which was a further boost to trope theory. Stove developed Williams's theory of induction and it has been defended by others.

His instruction at Harvard spans several decades and he came into contact with many students who went on to have respectable careers in philosophy, e.g., Roderick Chisholm and Donald Davidson. He supervised Nicholas Wolterstorff whose theory of universals as kinds bears a strong resemblance to Williams's ontology. But the student he influenced the most was David Lewis. As a student in the 1960s Lewis audited and enrolled in Williams's courses on ontology and cosmology, absorbing his Humean approach to metaphysics and his belief that metaphysics is legitimate. Lewis owes in part his Humean supervenience, four-dimensionalism, and metaphysics of time more generally to Williams. Lewis also developed certain arguments from Williams that proved pivotal in his own philosophical development. Just as Williams exploited analogies between time and space, Lewis exploited analogies between time and modality. Just as Williams argued that a realm of subsistent entities would lead to scepticism about one's existence, Lewis argued that a realm of possibles would lead to scepticism about one's actuality. For Lewis, the way out of the sceptical worry was to take actuality as a relative matter and interpret the word 'actual' as an indexical. The indexical account of actuality was – in Lewis's mind – one step down the road to modal realism: possible worlds are just as real as our world. Later on his career Lewis gravitated more and more towards Williams's ontology, expressing sympathy with a sparse theory of tropes.

Armstrong and Lewis were both influential figures who played their own part in bringing metaphysics back into mainstream philosophy. Given the influence of Williams on both Armstrong and Lewis, Williams played a key role in the revival of metaphysics. Williams's articles on trope theory and four-dimensionalism are classic articles in analytic philosophy – anthologised in many places and recently collected together with previously unpublished essays that advance his metaphysical theory in The Elements and Patterns of Being: Essays in Metaphysics (2018).

== Bibliography ==
=== Books ===
- 1947. The Ground of Induction. Harvard University Press. ISBN 0674432126
- 1966. Principles of Empirical Realism: Philosophical Essays. Charles C. Thomas. ASIN B0018HMCIC
- 2018. The Elements and Patterns of Being: Essays in Metaphysics. Oxford University Press. ISBN 9780198810384

=== Selected articles ===
- 1931. The Nature of Universals and of Abstractions. The Monist 41(4): 583–93.
- 1933. The Innocence of the Given. Journal of Philosophy 30(23): 617–28.
- 1934. Truth, Error and the Location of the Datum. Journal of Philosophy 31(16): 428–38.
- 1934. The Argument for Realism. The Monist 44(2): 186–209.
- 1937/1938. The Realistic Interpretation of Scientific Sentences. Erkenntnis 7(1): 169–78.
- 1937/1938. The Realistic Interpretation of Scientific Sentences II. Erkenntnis 7(1): 375–82.
- 1938. The Nature and Variety of the A Priori. Analysis 5(6): 85–94.
- 1944. Naturalism and the Nature of Things. Philosophical Review 53(5): 417–43.
- 1951. The Sea Fight Tomorrow. In Structure, Method and Meaning, ed. P. Henle, H. M. Kallen and S. K. Langer. New York: Liberal Arts Press.
- 1951. The Myth of Passage. Journal of Philosophy 48(15): 457–71.
- 1953. On the Elements of Being: I. Review of Metaphysics 7(1): 3–18.
- 1953. On the Elements of Being: II. Review of Metaphysics 7(2): 171–92.
- 1959. Mind as a Matter of Fact. Review of Metaphysics 13(2): 203–25.
- 1962. Dispensing with Existence. Journal of Philosophy 59(23): 748–63.
- 1963. Necessary Facts. Review of Metaphysics 16(4): 601–26.
- 1986. Universals and Existents. Australasian Journal of Philosophy 64(1): 1–14.
