= Metahistory =

Metahistory may refer to

- Metahistory (concept), part of historiography
- Metahistory: The Historical Imagination in Nineteenth-century Europe, 1973 book by Hayden White
