= Canadian Society for the Study of Rhetoric =

Canadian scholarly society

- Société Canadienne pour l’Étude de la Rhétorique
- Abbreviation: CSSR
- Formation: 1980; 46 years ago
- Purpose: Advocate and public voice, educator and network for the study of rhetoric
- Headquarters: Ottawa, Ontario, Canada
- Region served: Canada
- Official language: English; French
- Affiliations: Canadian Federation for the Humanities and Social Sciences; International Society for the History of Rhetoric
- Website: rhetcanada.org
- Formerly called: Canadian Seminar on the History of Rhetoric; Canadian Society for the History of Rhetoric

The Canadian Society for the Study of Rhetoric (CSSR; French: Société Canadienne pour l’Étude de la Rhétorique [SCÉR]) is a bilingual scholarly society based in Canada that is open to scholars involved in the teaching or researching of rhetoric. While the CSSR was founded as a Canadian version of the International Society for the History of Rhetoric, and while—as implied by its original name, the Canadian Seminar on the History of Rhetoric (CSHR)—it originally focused on the history of rhetoric, the CSSR now focuses on a range of rhetorical scholarship. Its membership typically includes scholars from North America and Europe (not just Canada) and its conferences typically include joint sessions with other societies as a "natural reflection of the interdisciplinary interests of [its] members."

The CSSR publishes an online refereed journal, Rhetor, and meets annually for an academic conference, usually as part of the annual Congress of Humanities and Social Sciences run by the Canadian Federation for the Humanities and Social Sciences.

== Presidents ==
- 1980–1981 Judith Rice Henderson
- 1981 Raymond Stephanson
- 1981–1984 Joseph Schmidt
- 1985 Elaine Fantham
- 1986–1988 Albert Halsall
- 1988–1990 John Stephen Martin
- 1990–1993 Albert Halsall
- 1993–1995 David Goodwin
- 1995–1997 Joanne S. Norman
- 1997–1999 Kim Fedderson
- 1999–2001 Philippa Spoel
- 2001–2003 Jennifer McLennan
- 2003–2005 Tracy Whalen
- 2005–2007 Sylvain Rheault
- 2007–2009 Shannon Purves-Smith
- 2009–2011 Rebecca Carruthers Den Hoed
- 2011–2013 Jeanie Wills
- 2013–2015 Pierre Zoberman
- 2015–2019 Tania Smith

== See also ==
- List of learned societies
