= Rhetorica =

Academic journal

- Discipline: Rhetoric
- Language: English
- Edited by: Debra Hawhee

Publication details
- History: 1983–present
- Publisher: University of California Press on behalf of the International Society for the History of Rhetoric

Standard abbreviations
- ISO 4: Rhetorica

Indexing
- ISSN: 0734-8584

Links
- Journal homepage

Rhetorica: A Journal of the History of Rhetoric is the official publication of the International Society for the History of Rhetoric. It is a peer-reviewed quarterly academic journal published University of California Press, in Berkeley, California. The journal includes articles, book reviews and bibliographies that examine the theory and practice of rhetoric in all periods and languages and their relationship with poetics, philosophy, religion and law. The official languages of the Society and of the journal are English, French, German, Italian, Latin, and Spanish, with articles and features corresponding.
