= Nancy Struever =

American historian

- Born: Nancie Schermerhorn; December 2, 1928 (age 97); LaSalle, Illinois, U.S.
- Children: 3

Academic background
- Education: Frances Shimer Academy; Connecticut College; University of Rochester
- Thesis: Rhetoric and Historical Consciousness in Italian Humanism; Rhetorical and Historical Modes in Coluccio Salutati, Leonardo Bruni, and Poggio Bracciolini (1966)
- Doctoral advisor: Hayden White
- Other advisor: Bernard Nicholas Schilling

Academic work
- Discipline: Renaissance studies, comparative literature
- Institutions: Hobart and William Smith Colleges; Johns Hopkins University

Nancie Schermerhorn Struever (born December 2, 1928) is an American historian of the Renaissance. She is a professor emerita in the department of comparative thought and literature at the Johns Hopkins Zanvyl Krieger School of Arts and Sciences where she joined the faculty in 1974. Struever was previously a professor at the Hobart and William Smith Colleges.

== Early life and education ==
Nancie Schermerhorn Struever was born December 2, 1928, in LaSalle, Illinois. She is the daughter of Olive M. Schermerhorn. She graduated from LaSalle-Peru High School in June 1945. From 1945 to 1946, Struever attended Frances Shimer Academy where she won the Elizabeth Percy Konrad trophy for excellence in English and the Phi Theta Kappa scholastic award. She majored in history during her junior a senior year at Connecticut College from 1946 to 1948.

Struever married Carl C. Struever Jr., an engineer at Eastman Kodak. She later completed a bachelor's degree in history at the University of Rochester College for Women where she graduated with distinction and Phi Beta Kappa in June 1954. She completed a M.A. in English in June 1957 at the University of Rochester. Her master's thesis conducted under advisor Bernard Nicholas Schilling was titled, A Comparison of the Historical Method and Literary Style of Edward Gibbon's Decline and Fall of the Roman Empire and Tomas Carlyle's French Revolution.

Struever commenced her doctoral studies in May 1961 under advisor Hayden White. While completing graduate courses, she studied Greek at the Colgate Rochester Crozer Divinity School. During the school year 1963 to 1964, she was awarded a $3,000 fellowship by the American Association of University Women, allowing her to spend a summer Florence. While there, she researched in the Archivio di Stato di Firenze and read Florentine manuscripts at the British Museum. Stuever was an instructor in the history department at Hobart and William Smith Colleges beginning in 1964. In 1966, Struever completed a Ph.D. in medieval history. Her dissertation was titled, Rhetoric and Historical Consciousness in Italian Humanism; Rhetorical and Historical Modes in Coluccio Salutati, Leonardo Bruni, and Poggio Bracciolini. The dissertation became the basis of her first book published in 1970.

At the time she completed her doctorate, Struever had a daughter and son in college and her youngest son was a freshman in high school. In a 1971 interview, Struever shared of her experiences as a doctoral student that, "...attitudes among the faculty ranged from encouraging to horrified. My worst problem was that U of R would not give me a graduate fellowship, because history obviously could only be my avocation, not my vocation. They didn't think I could be serious, so I spent two years as a teaching assistant without pay, in order to get my teaching credits."

== Career ==
In 1971, Struever, a professor of history at Hobart and William Smith Colleges, was awarded an American Council of Learned Societies fellowship that she would use to take a sabbatical from 1972 to 1973 in Italy to research for her second book.

In 1974, Struever became a professor at Johns Hopkins University.

In 1990, Struever was the president of the International Society for the History of Rhetoric.

In March 1998, the humanities center at Johns Hopkins sponsored a symposium in honor of her retirement.

== Personal life ==
In 1974, Struever moved to Tuscany-Canterbury, Baltimore. Struever's sons Bill and Fred are real estate developers in Baltimore. She owns a home in Maine. Struever and her daughter, Molly, shared ownership of the Children's Bookstore in Baltimore with JoAnn Fruchtman. By 1999, Fruchtman reported that she bought the Struevers out a few years after opening.

== Selected works ==
- Struever, Nancy S. (1970). The Language of History in the Renaissance: Rhetoric and Historical Consciousness in Florentine Humanism. Princeton University Press. ISBN 978-0-691-06180-1.
- Vickers, Brian; Struever, Nancy S. (1985). Rhetoric and the Pursuit of Truth: Language Change in the Seventeenth and Eighteenth Centuries. William Andrews Clark Memorial Library, University of California.
- Struever, Nancy S. (1992). Theory as Practice: Ethical Inquiry in the Renaissance. University of Chicago Press. ISBN 978-0-226-77742-9.
- Struever, Nancy S. (2009). Rhetoric, Modality, Modernity. University of Chicago Press. ISBN 978-0-226-77750-4.
- Struever, Nancy S. (2009). The History of Rhetoric and the Rhetoric of History. Ashgate. ISBN 978-0-7546-5999-0.
- Pender, Stephen; Struever, Nancy S., eds. (2012). Rhetoric and Medicine in Early Modern Europe. Ashgate. ISBN 978-1-4094-3022-3.
