= Elaine Fantham =

British-Canadian classical philologist (1933–2016)

- Born: 25 May 1933; Liverpool, England
- Died: 11 July 2016 (aged 83); Toronto, Ontario, Canada
- Education: Somerville College, Oxford
- Known for: Classics expertise

Elaine Fantham (born Elaine Crosthwaite, 25 May 1933 – 11 July 2016) was a British-Canadian classicist whose expertise lay particularly in Latin literature, especially comedy, epic poetry and rhetoric, and in the social history of Roman women. Much of her work was concerned with the intersection of literature and Greek and Roman history. She spoke fluent Italian, German and French and presented lectures and conference papers around the world—including in Germany, Italy, the Netherlands, Norway, Argentina, and Australia.

Her commentaries on Senecan tragedy, Lucan, and Ovid's Fasti in particular led to renewed interest in these subjects. Likewise her articles on aspects of the representation and realities of women at Rome remain a foundation for academic work in these areas. She was also classics commentator on NPR's Weekend Edition.

Fantham was Giger Professor of Latin at Princeton University from 1986 to 1999.

== Education ==
Elaine Fantham was born in Liverpool, United Kingdom. She studied at Somerville College, Oxford, where she read Literae Humaniores and received a first class BA in 1954, converted to an MA in 1957. She held a Leverhulme Research Fellowship at the University of Liverpool 1956–58. She completed her PhD at the University of Liverpool in 1965. Its thesis was entitled "A Commentary on the Curculio of Plautus", and was examined by R. G. Austin and O. Skutsch.

== Career ==
Fantham taught in a secondary school for girls in St Andrews, Scotland, for seven years, and briefly at the University of St Andrews. She moved to Indiana University Bloomington, and was a visiting lecturer for two years (1966–68). Following this, Fantham moved to Toronto where she taught at the University of Toronto for eighteen years (1968–86), being also appointed a visiting professor at Ohio State University, in Columbus, Ohio, in 1983. In 1986, Princeton University appointed her Giger Professor of Latin, a position which she held until her retirement in 2000., and she served as chair of its Department of Classics from 1989 to 1992.

After retiring from Princeton University, Fantham lived in Toronto with her daughter, and continued to make significant contributions to the Department of Classics at the University of Toronto. She taught an annual course there from 2003. She was active as a mentor across Canada and around the world.

== Classical associations and editorial committee roles ==
Between 1976 and 1979 Fantham was a member of the editorial committee of Phoenix, a journal of the Classical Association of Canada and did much to establish the international reputation of the journal. Fantham was vice-president of the Classical Association of Canada from 1982 to 1984, and vice-president and later president of the Canadian Society for the History of Rhetoric (1983–1986). From 2003 to 2004 Fantham was president of the American Philological Association and, from 2001 to 2006, she was honorary president of the Classical Association of Canada.

== Awards ==
On 5 January 2008 Fantham was given the Distinguished Service Award of the American Philological Association. In 2012 she was made an honorary fellow of Trinity College, University of Toronto. In May 2015 Fantham was awarded the Classical Association of Canada's Award of Merit.

== Personal life ==
She was married to the mathematician Peter Fantham and had two children, Julia and Roy.

== Works ==
=== Books ===
- Comparative Studies in Republican Latin Imagery (Toronto: University of Toronto Press, 1972) ISBN 0802052622
- Women in the Classical World: Image and Text (New York; Oxford: Oxford University Press, 1994) ISBN 0-19-506727-4.
- Roman Literary Culture: From Cicero to Apuleius (Baltimore: Johns Hopkins University Press, 1996) ISBN 0-8018-5204-8.
- Ovid's Metamorphoses, (Oxford: Oxford University Press, 2004) ISBN 0-19-515409-6.
- The Roman World of Cicero's De Oratore, (Oxford: Oxford University Press, 2004) ISBN 0-19-926315-9.
- Julia Augusti. The Emperor's Daughter (Abingdon: Routledge, 2006) ISBN 0-415-33146-3.
- Latin Poets and Italian Gods (Toronto: University of Toronto Press, 2009) ISBN 978-1-4426-4059-7
- Roman Literary Culture: From Plautus to Macrobius (Baltimore: Johns Hopkins University Press, 2013)

=== Festschrift ===
- Rolando Ferri, J. Mira Seo, Katharina Volk (ed.), Callida Musa: Papers on Latin Literature in Honor of R. Elaine Fantham. Materiali e discussioni per l'analisi dei testi classici 61 (Pisa/Roma: Fabrizio Serra editore, 2009) ISBN 9788862271752.

=== Ovatio ===
- 'Elaine Fantham', The Classical World, by Judith P. Hallett, vol. 99, no. 4 (Summer, 2006) 442 (in Latin)

=== Editing ===
- Greek Tragedy and its Legacy: Essays Presented to D. J. Conacher, edited by Martin Cropp, Elaine Fantham, and S.E. Scully (Calgary: University of Calgary Press, 1986)
- Caesar Against Liberty?: Perspectives on His Autocracy_{,} edited by Elaine Fantham and Francis Cairns (Cambridge: Francis Cairns, 2003)
- The Oxford Encyclopedia of Ancient Greece and Rome, edited by Michael Gagarin and Elaine Fantham (Oxford: Oxford University Press, 2010)
- The Emperor Nero: A Guide to the Ancient Sources, edited by Anthony A. Barrett, Elaine Fantham, and John C. Yardley (Princeton: Princeton University Press, 2016)

=== Commentaries ===
- Seneca, Troades: A Literary Introduction with Text, Translation, and Commentary (Princeton: Princeton University Press, 1982)
- Ovid, Fasti IV, introduction and commentary in English with the Latin text by Elaine Fantham (Cambridge: Cambridge University Press, 1998)
- Lucan, De Bello Civili Book II, edited by Elaine Fantham with the Latin text and commentary (Cambridge: Cambridge University Press, 1992)
- Cicero's pro L. Murena Oratio, introduction and commentary by Elaine Fantham, American Philological Association Texts and Commentaries Series (Oxford: Oxford University Press, 2013)

=== Translations ===
- Seneca's Troades: A Literary Introduction with Text, Translation, and Commentary (Princeton: Princeton University Press, 1982)
- Erasmus, Erasmus: Literary and Educational Writings, co-edited with Erika Rummel (Toronto: Toronto University Press, 1989)
- Virgil, Georgics, translated by Peter Fallon; with an introduction and notes by Elaine Fantham (Oxford: Oxford University Press, 2006)
- Virgil, Aeneid, translated by Frederick Ahl, introduction by Elaine Fantham (Oxford: Oxford University Press, 2007)
- Seneca, Selected Letters, translated with an introduction by Elaine Fantham (Oxford: Oxford University Press, 2010)
- Erasmus, Apophthegmata, translated and annotated by Betty I. Knott and Elaine Fantham (Toronto: University of Toronto Press, 2014)
- Change Me: Stories of Sexual Transformation from Ovid, translated by Jane Alison, with a foreword by Elaine Fantham, and an introduction by Alison Keith (New York: Oxford University Press, 2014)
- Seneca, Hardship and Happiness, translations by Elaine Fantham, Harry M. Hine, James Ker, and Gareth D. Williams (Chicago; The University of Chicago Press, 2014)
- Petrarch, Selected Letters, Volumes I and II I Tatti Renaissance Library Nos. 76 & 77 (Cambridge: Harvard University Press, 2017)

=== Chapters ===
- "Aemilia Pudentilla: Or the Wealthy Widow's Choice", Women in Antiquity: New Assessments, edited by Richard Hawley and Barbara Levick (London: Routledge, 1995)
- "'Envy and Fear the Begetter of Hate': Statius' Thebaid and the Genesis of Hatred", The Passions in Roman Thought and Literature (Cambridge: Cambridge University Press, 1997)
- "Allecto's First Victim: A Study of Vergil's Amata", Vergil's Aeneid: Augustan Epic and Political Context, edited by Hans-Peter Stahl (London: Duckworth, in association with The Classical Press of Wales, 1998)
- "Ovid's Fasti: Politics, History, and Religion", Brill's Companion to Ovid, edited by Barbara Weiden Boyd (Leiden: Brill, 2002)
- "The Performing Prince", A Companion to the Neronian Age, edited by Emma Buckley and Martin T. Dinter (Chichester: Wiley-Blackwell, 2013) 17–28

=== Articles ===
- "Virgil's Dido and Seneca's tragic heroines", Greece and Rome, vol. 22, no. 1 (April 1975) 1–10
- "Sex, Status, and Survival in Hellenistic Athens: A Study of Women in New Comedy", Phoenix, vol. 29, no. 1 (Spring 1975) 44–74
- "Sexual Comedy in Ovid's Fasti: Sources and Motivation", Harvard Studies in Classical Philology, vol. 87 (1983) 185–216
- "Mater dolorosa", Hermathena, no. 177/8 (Winter 2004 and Summer 2005) 113-24
