= Historiography and Historiophoty =

"Historiography and Historiophoty" is the name of an essay by historian and literary critic Hayden White first published in 1988 in The American Historical Review. In the essay, White coins the term "historiophoty" to describe the "representation of history and our thought about it in visual images and filmic discourse". White says historiophoty "...is in contrast to Historiography which is the representation of history in verbal images and written discourse".

White originally coined the term as a rhetorical device in response to an essay by Robert A. Rosenstone in the same issue of AHR entitled "History in images/History in words: Reflections on the possibility of really putting history onto film". For the sake of exploring Rosenstone's premise (that history can be portrayed on film), he created the term historiophoty as a description of the study of history through film. White was not necessarily claiming that historiophoty exists, or that it ought to; his essay was a thought experiment on what historiophoty would be like if in fact such a thing did exist.

Whatever White's intention, since the publication of his 1988 essay the word historiophoty has entered into public and professional discourse. For example Brian Le Beau wrote "Historiography Meets Historiophoty: The Perils and Promise of Rendering the Past on Film" in American Studies Volume 38, no. 1 (Spring 1997). A book has been published titled History of Western Historiography, History of England, Historiophoty by Chou, Liang-kai.

== Sources ==
- Rosenstone, Robert. "History in images/History in words: Reflections on the possibility of really putting history onto film". The American Historical Review, Vol. 93, No. 5. (Dec., 1988), pp. 1173-1185. Available online through JSTOR.
- White, Hayden. "Historiography and Historiophoty". The American Historical Review, Vol. 93, No. 5. (Dec., 1988), pp. 1193-1199. Available online through JSTOR.
