= Hayden White =

American historian

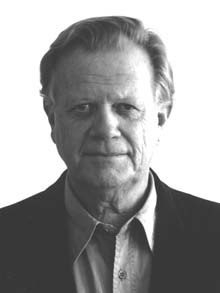
- Born: Hayden V. White; July 12, 1928; Martin, Tennessee, US
- Died: March 5, 2018 (aged 89); Santa Cruz, California, US

Academic background
- Education: University of Michigan
- Influences: Aristotle; Max Weber; Jean-Paul Sartre; Maurice Merleau-Ponty; Roland Barthes; William J. Bossenbrook; Erich Auerbach; Northrop Frye; Moses Maimonides

Academic work
- Discipline: History
- Institutions: University of California, Santa Cruz; Stanford University; University of California, Los Angeles; Wesleyan University; University of Rochester; Wayne State University
- Doctoral students: Nancy Struever
- Notable students: Lawrence Grossberg
- Main interests: Metahistory
- Notable works: Metahistory (1973)
- Notable ideas: Historiophoty; metahistorical trope
- Influenced: Sharon Traweek

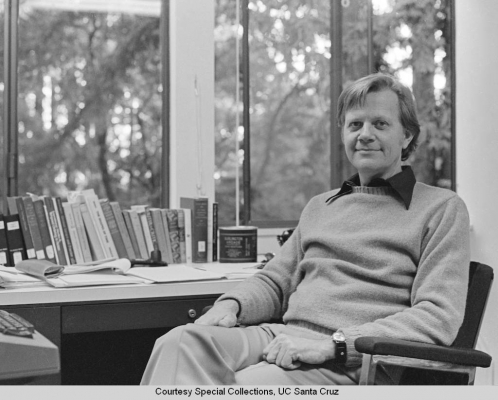
Hayden V. White

Hayden V. White (July 12, 1928 – March 5, 2018) was an American historian in the tradition of literary criticism. He wrote Metahistory: The Historical Imagination in Nineteenth-century Europe in 1973.

== Career ==
White was born in Martin, Tennessee in 1928. He received his Bachelor of Arts degree from Wayne State University (1951) and his Master of Arts (1952) and Doctor of Philosophy (1955) degrees from the University of Michigan. While an undergraduate at Wayne State, White studied history under William J. Bossenbrook alongside then-classmate Arthur Danto. After completing his PhD, White taught at several universities, including Wayne State University, the University of Rochester, UCLA, and Wesleyan University.

In 1978, White was hired to helm an avant-garde, interdisciplinary PhD program called History of Consciousness at the University of California, Santa Cruz. Although the program had been founded as a "board of study" in 1966, White was the first faculty member to receive a full-time appointment in the program. He built the program up through additional hires, including the hires of James Clifford, Donna Haraway, and others.

He was elected to the American Academy of Arts and Sciences in 1991. In 2000, he was elected to the American Philosophical Society.

In 1998, White directed a seminar ("The Theory of the Text") at the School of Criticism and Theory.

Among White's influences, there were two major figures who taught him "how the historian interprets something." The first was William J. Bossenbrook, who taught White as an undergraduate at Wayne State University. Bossenbrook saw history as fundamentally a story of the conflict between ideas, values, and dreams. Therefore, Bossenbrook regarded history as a mystery to be constantly pondered and studied rather than a puzzle to be solved. In his last book, The Practical Past (2014), White paid tribute to the significant effect of Bossenbrook. The second was 12th-century Jewish philosopher Moses Maimonides, particularly his interpretation of the Bible. Maimonides said that since the creation is vast and complex, and God's will is beyond human's understanding, the goal of biblical interpretation should be to maximize possible interpretations. With this influence, White enjoyed comparing historians' tasks. The influence of Maimonides helped White focus on a variety of possible interpretations of history, not limited or prescribed history, which diminishes the possibility of interpretation.

White ended his career as University Professor Emeritus at the history of consciousness department of the University of California, Santa Cruz, having previously retired from the comparative literature department of Stanford University.

== Metahistory (1973) ==
In his seminal 1973 book Metahistory: The Historical Imagination in Nineteenth-Century Europe, White claimed that our inventory of actual historical texts—not according to any idealized academic theory of historiography, but as we actually find them when we go into the archives to read the primary sources—are marked by rhetorical strategies more than they are characterized by the monotonous litany of unreconstructed fact or pure and undistorted data, free of interpretation (and therefore of rhetorical distortion) as prevailing historiographic notions of the time seemed to imply.

White’s study especially focuses on how these rhetorical strategies are used in 19th century historical texts, but he focuses on this period only because an exhaustive analysis of all historical texts ever produced would be unfeasible. His selection of a specific and limited set of histories demonstrates and supports his general argument his general principle. Re: That the whole field of history winds up snarled in paradox when the universal linear totality of all lived human time (‘diachronic’ time) is set against the dynamism of human conflicts and psychology (records of ‘synchronic’ lived experience) instead of harmonizing these elements, however imperfectly.

Hayden’s recommended strategies for navigating these problems of historiography include explanation by argument, explanation by narrative logic (‘emplotment’), and explanation by ideological implication. He argued that historical writing was influenced by literary writing in many ways, sharing the strong reliance on narrative for meaning. Therefore, White contradicts the view that historical writing can be objective or purely and scientifically empirical.

White mentions two figures who have enabled people to ask questions about history's objectivity: Marx and Nietzsche. According to White, these thinkers both use their philosophy to consider history which “not only makes us know something about the historical process but know how it knows it." They focus on the problem of history. Marx regards the problem of history as the problem of the mode of explanation, while, for Nietzsche, the problem is the problem of the mode of emplotment. For Marx there is a truthful way of telling the story which is to focus on material data etc. (re: historical materialism); while, for Nietzsche, there isn’t a right way to tell the truth: the abstracted nature of stories in general conceals the fact that the real world, beyond our interpretations of it, does not follow a humanly perceptible narrative logic. Hayden points out that both the interpretations of Marx and Nietzsche are loaded with their own biases.

Thus, history is recorded differently depending on which mode the historian chooses. As a result, ‘a value-free history’ cannot exist. Historiography consists of well-constructed narratives.

White also argued, however, that history is most successful when it uses this "narrativity", since it is what allows history to be meaningful.

He insists, in particular in chapter 7, that philosophies of history are indispensable elements in historiography, which cannot be separated from historiography. For him, history is not simply a list of chronological events. Emphasizing history as a narrative using language, he argues that true history should contain both characteristics of synchronic (simultaneous, in-real-time) and diachronic (covering antecedents and precedents over a longer and more generalized period to explain particular events) .

This view is contrary to historians such as Eduard Fueter George Peabody Gooch, and Benedetto Croce, who tried to distinguish between historiography and philosophies of history.

== Lawsuit against the LAPD ==
White figured in a California Supreme Court case regarding covert intelligence gathering on college campuses by police officers in the Los Angeles Police Department. During 1972, while a professor of history at UCLA and acting as sole plaintiff, White sued Chief of Police Edward M. Davis, alleging the illegal expenditure of public funds in connection with covert intelligence gathering by police at UCLA. The covert activities included police officers registering as students, taking notes of discussions occurring in classes, and making police reports on these discussions. The California Supreme Court found for White in a unanimous decision. This case set the standard that limits legal police surveillance of political activity in California.

== Bibliography ==
- The Ethics of Narrative, Volume 2: Essays on History, Literature, and Theory, 2007-2017. Ithaca: Cornell University Press. 2023. Ed. Robert Doran, Fwd. Mieke Bal
- The Ethics of Narrative, Volume 1: Essays on History, Literature, and Theory, 1998-2007. Ithaca: Cornell University Press. 2022. Ed. Robert Doran, Fwd. Judith Butler
- 40th Anniversary Edition: Metahistory: The Historical Imagination in Nineteenth-Century Europe. Baltimore: The Johns Hopkins University Press. 2014.
- The Practical Past. Evanston: Northwestern University Press. 2014.
- The Fiction of Narrative: Essays on History, Literature, and Theory, 1957-2007. Baltimore: The Johns Hopkins University Press. 2010. Ed. Robert Doran
- Figural Realism: Studies in the Mimesis Effect. Baltimore: The Johns Hopkins University Press. 1999.
- "Historiography and Historiophoty", The American Historical Review, Vol. 93, No. 5 (Dec., 1988), pp. 1193–1199 (online).
- The Content of the Form: Narrative Discourse and Historical Representation. Baltimore: The Johns Hopkins University Press. 1987.
- "Historical Pluralism", Critical Inquiry, Vol. 12, No. 3 (Spring, 1986), pp. 480–493.
- "The Question of Narrative in Contemporary Historical Theory", History and Theory, Vol. 23, No. 1 (Feb., 1984), pp. 1–33.
- "The Politics of Historical Interpretation: Discipline and De-Sublimation", Critical Inquiry, Vol. 9, No. 1, The Politics of Interpretation (Sep., 1982), pp. 113–137.
- as editor (1982) with Margaret Brose Representing Kenneth Burke. Baltimore: The Johns Hopkins University Press.
- "The Value of Narrativity in the Representation of Reality", Critical Inquiry, Vol. 7, No. 1, On Narrative (Autumn, 1980), pp. 5–27.
- Tropics of Discourse: Essays in Cultural Criticism. Baltimore: The Johns Hopkins University Press. 1978.
- "Interpretation in History", New Literary History, Vol. 4, No. 2, On Interpretation: II (Winter, 1973), pp. 281–314.
- "Foucault Decoded: Notes from Underground", History and Theory, Vol. 12, No. 1 (1973), pp. 23–54.
- Metahistory: The Historical Imagination in Nineteenth-Century Europe. Baltimore: The Johns Hopkins University Press. 1973.
- The Greco-Roman Tradition. New York: Harper & Row. 1973. ISBN 9780060470647.
- as co-author (1970) with Willson Coates, The Ordeal of Liberal Humanism: An Intellectual History of Western Europe, vol. II: Since the French Revolution. New York: McGraw-Hill, 1970.
- as co-editor (1969) with Giorgio Tagliacozzo, Giambattista Vico: An International Symposium. Baltimore and London: Johns Hopkins University Press.
- as editor The Uses of History: Essays in Intellectual and Social History. Detroit: Wayne State University Press. 1968.
- "The burden of history", History and Theory, Vol. 5, No. 2 (1966), pp. 111–134.
- as co-author (1966) with Willson Coates and J. Salwin Schapiro, The Emergence of Liberal Humanism. An Intellectual History of Western Europe, vol. I: From the Italian Renaissance to the French Revolution. New York: McGraw-Hill, 1966.
