= Adventures of a Postmodern Historian: Living and Writing the Past =

2016 memoir by Robert Rosenstone

- Cover
- Author: Robert A. Rosenstone
- Language: English
- Genre: Memoir
- Publisher: Bloomsbury Academic
- Publication date: September 22, 2016
- Publication place: United Kingdom
- Media type: Print (hardcover, paperback), e-book
- Pages: 224
- ISBN: 978-1-4742-7421-0 (hardcover)

Adventures of a Postmodern Historian: Living and Writing the Past is a 2016 memoir by American historian Robert A. Rosenstone. Rosenstone chronicles his half-century career through four major research projects conducted in Franco's Spain, the Soviet Union, Japan, and Hollywood, each corresponding to a published work: his history of the Abraham Lincoln Battalion, his biography of John Reed, his study of nineteenth-century Americans in Japan, and his scholarship on film and history. Combining personal memoir with reflections on the evolution of historical practice, he employs multiple narrative voices, including reconstructed dialogue and fictional letters based on actual correspondence, to study how a historian's experiences shape the histories he writes. Published by Bloomsbury Academic, the memoir also addresses Rosenstone's role as historical consultant on Warren Beatty's Academy Award-winning film Reds and his subsequent arguments for the validity of film as a form of historical knowledge.

== Background ==
Rosenstone wrote the memoir as a sustained effort to understand, through what he described as the dark and shifting screen of memory, whether and how his works of history had both reflected and inflected the larger culture over the preceding half-century. He stated that his goal was not simply to obtain a deeper sense of self-knowledge but to share with others insights earned through researching, thinking, and writing about the past. The book, he explained, chronicles how someone trained in the norms of the profession in the mid-twentieth century came to alter his beliefs about and practices of history over the following decades, a process shaped by personal interests and desires, changes in the social, cultural, political, and technological landscape, encounters with books and people, and the impact upon academia of new theories about the relationship between language and reality.

In describing the formal choices underlying the work, Rosenstone cited Alfred Hitchcock's definition of drama as "life with the boring parts left out." He identified two tendencies of the historian's memoir that he sought to avoid: the inclusion of so much detail that the overall thrust disappears into a welter of disparate moments and facts, and an avoidance of the personal, subjective, intimate, and psychological in favor of the external markers of a career. These tendencies, he argued, leave out major questions that underlie historical work, including why historians choose their topics, how they decide what approach to take, how they shape their narratives, and to what extent the experiences and physicality of the research process mark the works they produce.

Though the memoir uses standard sources such as personal memory, letters, diaries, journal entries, articles, and books, Rosenstone intended its form to challenge the boundaries of the genre and offer suggestions for broader literary strategies to evoke the past. The structure partakes of collage, with sections that do not necessarily follow directly from the previous one but may overlap, precede, or occur in a different time zone altogether. This approach, he explained, reflected a desire to avoid conjuring the past as a seamless story devoid of ambiguity, since a search for the truths of the past should allow works to express some of the ambiguities and disconnection that mark all lives.

Rosenstone addressed the presence of the word postmodern in the title, acknowledging that for some readers it might be problematic. He first encountered the term in the late 1980s when critics applied it to his earlier work on Americans in Meiji Japan, and he later embraced it while making the case for dramatic films as a vehicle of history. Although its definitions could seem multifarious and contradictory to the point of meaninglessness, the word continued to speak to him of something real and important, particularly when he considered the differences between the intellectual, cultural, and historical climate of the 1960s, when he was trained as a historian, and that of the contemporary period, long after revolutions in communications and research techniques, after the subjectivity of language had returned to scholarly discourse, and after topics for historians had expanded to include the once unthinkable.

== Summary ==
The book challenges the professional expectation, instilled in graduate school, that historians should separate their personal lives and beliefs from their scholarly work. Rosenstone argues that this ideal is a fiction since the fingerprints of a historian's mind, soul, and ideology inevitably appear in everything they choose to research and write. The narrative employs three distinct voices: a conventional retrospective-introspective first-person voice, a historiographic voice used for theoretical reflection on the foundations of the discipline, and a fictional voice through which imaginary characters speak, personifying circumstances remembered by the author. These fictional passages, graphically distinguished from the main text, take the form of letters from women who shared some of the experiences described, figures given various names depending on the circumstances. The author states that while the content of these letters varies from the originals, the tone does not, and he presents them as inventions based on the vocabulary and contents of actual correspondence he received. Other elements include dialogue for conversations that took place so long ago that no one could remember the exact words, rendered in italics to indicate they are not direct quotations, as well as fragments from previously published works used to suggest how personal experiences can become part of the history one writes.

The work is organized around four major research projects that corresponded to distinct geographical and intellectual journeys. The opening section recounts Rosenstone's doctoral research on the Abraham Lincoln Battalion, the American volunteers who fought in the Spanish Civil War. Working from a conviction that no one would remember what happened at Jarama unless it was recorded well, Rosenstone traveled through Franco's Spain in 1964, visiting battlefields, interviewing veterans, and navigating the suspicion that American scholars researching leftist subjects encountered from both Spanish authorities and members of the Old Left. The resulting book attempted to recount the battalion's military engagements alongside social, personal, and ideological issues, often alternating chapters on battlefield actions with those devoted to the backgrounds, beliefs, and internal conflicts of the volunteers.

The second section follows his research trip to the Soviet Union in the early 1970s for his biography of John Reed, the American journalist and radical who witnessed the Bolshevik Revolution. Rosenstone was drawn to Reed as a figure who struggled with issues that seemed contemporary and personal for his generation: how to balance one's life between activism and art, between working to change the world and trying to describe that change. The narrative recounts his frustrating encounters with Soviet bureaucracy as he attempted to gain access to revolutionary sites like the Smolny Institute, as well as an unexpected Cold War coup during a cultural thaw when an archive he had vainly sought access to suddenly provided him with two thousand photocopied pages of material. The biography was structured so that each chapter centered on a document Reed had written during a particular period of his life, with the aim of making each stage read as a kind of mini-drama that captured Reed's emotional highs and lows.

The third section covers a Fulbright year teaching in Japan and the subsequent research that became a study of three nineteenth-century Americans who traveled to Japan and were transformed by their encounters with its culture. Rosenstone chose to write about a crypto-missionary, a scientist, and a writer, studying what Westerners learned from their time in Japan, a question fueled by his own experience and the realization that whatever he himself had absorbed was subtle, having to do with spirit or vision rather than anything easily defined. Rather than telling the three biographies in sequence, he structured the work around what he called the stages of the Japan experience: Landing, Searching, Loving, Learning, and Remembering, which he later recognized as also the stages of his own year in Japan projected into the past. He employed the present tense to increase immediacy and included self-reflexive passages in which the biographer appeared as a minor character who assessed the shortcomings of his evidence and shared the problems of constructing the narrative.

The fourth section documents his involvement with Hollywood, beginning with a 1972 telephone call from Warren Beatty, who was planning a film about John Reed. Conversations between the historian and the actor continued for seven years, eventually leading to Rosenstone serving as historical consultant on the Academy Award-winning film. This experience, combined with broader technological and cultural shifts, led Rosenstone to develop arguments about the validity of film as a form of historical knowledge, producing numerous essays and two books on the subject while also helping to establish the first section on historical films in the American Historical Review. His collaboration with Beatty is portrayed neither as academic heroism nor as a panegyric to outsider influence on academia, but rather as a depiction of a quixotic, distant figure whose commitment and vision were evident despite frustrations and imperfections in getting the history right.

A concluding section reflects on the author's turn to fiction after his experimental historical works—including an unconventional family history and two novels rooted in historical research. Rosenstone argues that the reality of the past does not lie in an assemblage of data but in a field of stories, a place where fact, truth, fiction, invention, forgetting, and myth are so entangled that they cannot be separated.

== Critical reception ==
Jaume Aurell, a medievalist who had separately published research on historians' autobiographies, placed the memoir within the long tradition of life writing by historians while arguing that Rosenstone innovated by symphonically employing three narrative voices: the retrospective-introspective, the historiographic, and the fictional. He compared the conjunction of these voices to the Cubist style of Picasso's Guernica, which represents reality from different perspectives simultaneously. Aurell found the work "superbly well written" with a "notably magnetic effect on the reader" and concluded that it was intended for those who still believe in the effect that telling stories produces, beyond an academic history in danger of losing its connection with society.

Roger Hillman characterized the memoir as representing the strengths and innovations yielded from working at the threshold of two vital Humanities disciplines. He noted that the structure was enriched by the inclusion of letters from female correspondents, which he described as "a healthy injection of the erstwhile epistolary novel" and "a high point of the memoir." Hillman observed that the work bridged three temporal arches spanning the historical event in real time, its subsequent analysis by a historian, and that same author's reflections from a still later vantage point. He suggested that the inside Hollywood picture furnished by the author of a book about John Reed was "intriguing and highly illuminating," and concluded that in these memoirs, "living the past is never living in the past."

Jamie Melrose praised the "borderline folksy but plain, direct, telling prose" and described the work as "less instructional, more meditative" than he had anticipated. Melrose judged the memoir to be "a good piece of travel writing" that captures "the messy but motivated business of historical practice," considering it as "a Bildungsroman stripped of pomposity and Damascene moments" in which the historian is humanized and "the banality of historical uneasiness" is acknowledged.

Minsoo Kang described it as "an entertaining book that can be enjoyed by academic historians and the general reader alike."
