= Robert A. Rosenstone =

American historian

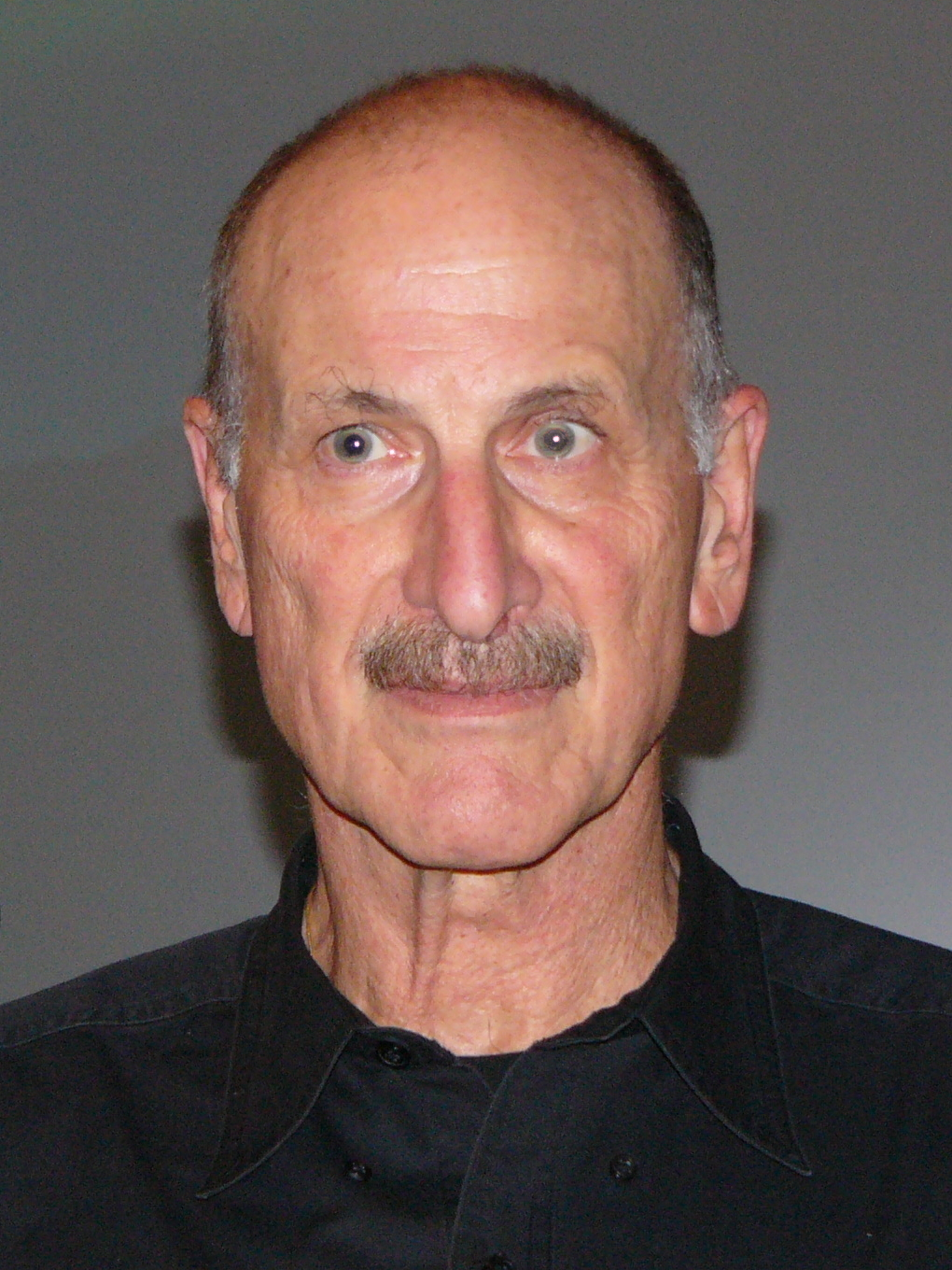
- Rosenstone in 2008
- Born: 1936 (age 89–90); Montreal, Quebec
- Education: University of California, Los Angeles
- Scientific career
- Fields: history, visual media
- Workplaces: California Institute of Technology

Robert A. Rosenstone (born 1936) is an American author, historian, and professor emeritus of history at the California Institute of Technology. He studies the relationship between history and the visual media. He has written two books on the topic, Visions of the Past: the Challenge of Film to Our Idea of History (Harvard, 1995), and History on Film / Film on History (Pearson, 2006, 2nd edition 2012), and has edited a collection of essays, Revisioning History: Film and the Construction of a New Past (Princeton, 1995). His most recent addition to the field, co-edited with Constantin Parvulescu, is A Blackwell Companion to Historical Film (Wiley-Blackwell, 2013)

== Life ==
Rosenstone was born in Montreal, Quebec, the son of Jewish immigrants. He lived most of his life in Los Angeles, California. He received a Ph.D. degree in history from the University of California, Los Angeles in 1966. He was assistant professor at the University of Oregon from 1965 to 1966. He was a professor of history at the Caltech from 1966 and is now professor emeritus. He lives in Los Angeles.

Rosenstone has been a visiting professor at Oxford University, the University of Manchester, St. Andrews University, the University of Barcelona, the European University Institute (Florence), Kyushu University (Japan), the University of La Laguna (Canary Islands), and Tolima University (Colombia).

== Writings and career ==
In his early career, Rosenstone worked on topics of social and political radicalism. This resulted in two books, Crusade of the Left: The Lincoln Battalion in the Spanish Civil War (Pegasus, 1969, republished Transaction 2009), and Romantic Revolutionary: A Biography of John Reed (Knopf, 1975; republished Harvard, 1989).

Rosenstone has since focused on the topic of how to write about the past, particularly emphasizing and encouraging innovative forms of historical narrative. His book Mirror in the Shrine: American Encounters with Meiji Japan (Harvard, 1988) was an experimental, multi-voiced piece of history. As a way of encouraging such innovation, Rosenstone helped to found the journal Rethinking History: The Journal of Theory and Practice in 1997.

In 1989 he was asked to create a film section for The American Historical Review. He has been on the editorial board of several journals, including Film Historia (Barcelona), Frames (St. Andrews University); California Quarterly, and Reviews in American History.

He has written several works of fiction involving historical characters and events, including a book of stories titled The Man Who Swam into History: The (Mostly) True Story of my Jewish Family (Texas, 2002), and a historical novel based on the life of Russian writer Isaac Babel, King of Odessa (Northwestern, 2003). His most recent novel is set in contemporary Spain, Red Star, Crescent Moon: A Muslim - Jewish Love Story (2008).

== Film work ==
Rosenstone has worked on several films, both dramatic features and documentaries. His biography of John Reed, "Romantic Revolutionary", (Knopf, 1975) was used as the basis for the film Reds, on which he worked as historical consultant for seven years.

== Awards and recognition ==
Rosenstone has been awarded four scholarships by the National Endowment for the Humanities, three from the Fulbright program, and has been a research fellow at both the East–West Center (Honolulu) from 1981 to 1982 and the Getty Research Institute from 2004 to 2005. His books and essays have been translated into 11 languages, including French, Spanish, Italian, Portuguese, Czech, Polish, German, Hungarian, Korean, Japanese, and Hebrew. He has lectured at more than 50 universities on six continents.

== Books ==
- "Crusade of the Left: The Lincoln Battalion and the Spanish Civil War", NY: Pegasus, 1969.
- "Romantic Revolutionary: A Biography of John Reed", New York: Alfred Knopf, Inc., 1975; Paperback Editions - Vintage, 1981; Cambridge: Harvard, 1992. Award: Silver Medal, Commonwealth Club of California, 1975 Translations: Spanish, French, Italian, Hungarian, Korean
- "Mirror in the Shrine: American Encounters in Meiji Japan", Cambridge: Harvard, 1988. History Book Club Selection, 1988. Paperback edition: Harvard University Press, Translations: Japanese, Italian.
- "Revisioning History: Filmmakers and the Construction of the Past", co-editor. Princeton, N.J.: Princeton University Press, 1995. Translation: Korean
- "Visions of the Past: The Challenge of Film to Our Idea of History", Cambridge: Harvard University Press, 1995. Award: 1995 Book of the Year, Film Historia (Barcelona). Translation: Spanish
- "King of Odessa", Evanston, IL: Northwestern University Press, 2003. Award: Barnes and Noble “Great New Writer”
- "Experiments in Rethinking History", co-editor. London: Routledge, 2004.
- "History on Film / Film on History", London: Longman Pearson, 2006. 2nd edition, 2013. Translations: Spanish, Portuguese
- "A Blackwell Companion to Historical Film", Oxford: Wiley-Blackwell, 2013.
- "Cine y visualidad", Santiago, Chile: University of Finis Terrae, 2013.
- Adventures of a Postmodern Historian: London, New York: Bloomsbury, 2016
