= Keith Campbell (philosopher) =

Australian philosopher (1938–2024)

Keith Campbell FAHA (1938 – 12 October 2024) was an Australian philosopher working in metaphysics.

== Biography ==
With D. M. Armstrong, Campbell was one of the founders of so-called Australian materialism and, within it, of a variety of trope theory. He also had a distinctive view of concrete and abstract objects: the former can exist by themselves, and the latter are incapable of independent existence.

He refused, following Frank P. Ramsey, the necessity of choice between realism and nominalism in the problem of universals, because they both share "a false presupposition being that any quality or relation must be a universal" (Campbell 1991, preface).

The separation between the University of Sydney's Departments of Traditional and Modern Philosophy and of General Philosophy is attributed to his organising the proposal in 1973. He was a senior lecturer in the "Traditional and Modern" one and later became an emeritus professor in the recombined Department of Philosophy (part of the School of Philosophical and Historical Inquiry).

Campbell was elected a Fellow of the Australian Academy of the Humanities in 1977.

Campbell was known as a co-editor of Ontology, Causality, and Mind: Essays in Honour of D. M. Armstrong, and as author of Body and Mind. Campbell died on 12 October 2024, at the age of 85.

== Bibliography ==
- Body and Mind, Garden City, N.Y., Anchor Books, 1970, (2nd edition, 1984).
- Metaphysics: An introduction, Encino, Calif.: Dickenson Pub. Co., (The Dickenson series in philosophy), 1976.
- A Stoic Philosophy of Life, Lanham, MD: University Press of America, 1986.
- Abstract Particulars (Philosophical Theory), Cambridge, Mass., USA : B. Blackwell, 1991.
- Ontology, Causality, and Mind: Essays in Honour of D.M. Armstrong, Keith Campbell, John Bacon, and Lloyd Reinhardt (eds.), Cambridge: Cambridge University Press, 1993.
