= Metahistory: The Historical Imagination in Nineteenth-century Europe =

1973 book by Hayden White

Metahistory: The Historical Imagination in 19th-century Europe
- Author: Hayden White
- Language: English
- Subject: Historiography
- Publisher: Johns Hopkins University Press
- Publication date: 1973
- Publication place: United States
- Media type: Print
- ISBN: 0-8018-1761-7
- OCLC: 2438028

Metahistory: The Historical Imagination in Nineteenth-century Europe is a work of historiography by Hayden White first published in 1973. On the second page of his introduction, White stated:

My own analysis of the deep structure of the historical imagination of Nineteenth century Europe is intended to provide a new perspective on the current debate over the nature and function of historical knowledge.

The theoretical framework is outlined in the first 50 pages of the book, which consider in detail eight major figures of 19th-century history and the philosophy of history. The larger context of historiography and writing in general is also considered. White's approach uses systematically a fourfold structural schema with two terms mediating between a pair of opposites.

== Synopsis ==
According to White, historians begin their work by constituting a chronicle of events which is to be organized into a coherent story. These are the two preliminary steps before processing the material into a plot which is argumented as to express an ideology. Thus the historical work is "a verbal structure in the form of a narrative prose discourse that purports to be a model, or icon, of past structures and processes in the interest of explaining what they were by representing them".

For the typologies of emplotment, argumentation and ideologies White refers to works by Northrop Frye, Stephen Pepper and Karl Mannheim. His four basic employments are provided by the archetypical genres of romance, comedy, tragedy and satire. The modes of argumentation, following Pepper's 'adequate root metaphors' are formist, organist, mechanicist and contextualist. Among the main types of Ideology White adopts anarchy, conservatism, radicalism and liberalism. White affirms that elective affinities link the three different aspects of a work and only four combinations (out of 64) are without internal inconsistencies or 'tensions'. The limitation arises through a general mode of functioning—representation, reduction, integration or negation, which White assimilates to one of the four main tropes: metaphor, metonymy, synecdoche and irony. Structuralists as Roman Jakobson or Emile Benveniste have used mostly an opposition between the first two of them but White refers to an earlier classification, adopted by Giambattista Vico and contrasts metaphor with irony. The exemplary figures chosen by White present the ideal types of historians and philosophers.

Synoptic table of Hayden White's Metahistory
Trope	Mode	Emplotment	Argument	Ideology	Historian	Philosopher
Metaphor	Representational	Romance	Formist	Anarchist	Michelet	Nietzsche
Metonymy	Reductionist	Tragedy	Mechanicist	Radical	Tocqueville	Marx
Synecdoche	Integrative	Comedy	Organicist	Conservative	Ranke	Hegel
Irony	Negational	Satire	Contextualist	Liberal	Burckhardt	Croce

== Reception ==
Frank Ankersmit has forcefully asserted the importance of Metahistory for the English speaking world. In the view of Ankersmit and like-minded scholars, White's work has made obsolete the view of language as neutral medium in historiography and has provided a way to treat methodological issues at a level higher than elementary propositions and atomic facts. So, with it, "philosophy of history finally, belatedly, underwent its linguistic turn and became part of the contemporary intellectual scene."

Norman Levitt has identified White as "the most magisterial spokesman" for relativist and postmodernist historiography, where "[w]hen one particular narrative prevails, the dirty work is invariably done by 'rhetoric', never evidence and logic, which are, in any case, simply sleight-of-language designations for one kind of rhetorical strategy".

Be that as it may, it is unclear whether White himself would care to be closely identified with relativist and postmodernist schools of thought, given his sharp critiques of several key figures associated with those schools (not only postmodernism's outspoken official proponent, Jean-Francois Lyotard, but also—and more directly—certain unofficial poststructuralist exponents such as Michel Foucault, Roland Barthes and Jacques Derrida, whom White dubbed "absurdist critics"). What is clear is that White was, at the very least, stimulated by the ideas of several of these figures, particularly Barthes (whom White honored in The Content of the Form with an epigraph ["Le fait n'a jamais qu'une existence linguistique"] and the rueful remark that Barthes has been "profoundly missed" since his death) and Foucault (with whose work White demonstrates intense engagement in the essay "Foucault's discourse: The Historiography of Anti-Humanism"). Furthermore, White has denied the charge of relativism, averring that the reality of events in the past is not contradicted by literary portrayals of those events.

Along similar lines, White may also be regarded as a traditional moralist, inasmuch as he has asked of historical and fictional narrative, "[O]n what other grounds [than moralism] could a narrative of real events possibly conclude? […] What else could narrative closure consist of than the passage from one moral order to another?"

For several of the reasons given above, White's ideas are somewhat controversial among academic historians, who have expressed both enthusiasm for and frustration with Metahistory. For instance, Arthur Marwick praised it as "a brilliant analysis of the rhetorical techniques of some famous early 19th-century historians ... [who wrote] well before the emergence of professional history." Yet in the very next breath Marwick complained that "White seems to have made very little acquaintanceship with what historians write today."

== Sources ==
- Hayden White, Metahistory: The Historical Imagination in 19th-century Europe, 1973 ISBN 0-8018-1761-7
