= International Society for the History of Rhetoric =

Academic association

The International Society for the History of Rhetoric (ISHR) is the premier international academic association that promotes the historical study of rhetoric. ISHR was founded in Zurich, Switzerland in 1977 and brings together interdisciplinary scholars from fields such as history, classics, philology, literature, linguistics, philosophy, politics, law, communication, and composition.

== History ==
The International Society for the History of Rhetoric (ISHR) was founding in Zurich, Switzerland on June 30, 1977. The Society's Constitution was drafted by Lloyd Bitzer. The founding committee comprised Marc Fumaroli, Anton D. Leeman, Alain Michel, James J. Murphy, Heinrich Plett, and Brian Vickers. Founding members included Carroll C. Arnold, Robert N. Gaines, Kathleen Jamieson, Luisa Lopez-Grigera, James J. Murphy, Lester Olson, and Roger Parr. Also in attendance were now famous rhetoricians such as Craig Kallendorf, Wayne C. Booth, Chaim Perelman, Walter J. Ong, Pierre Laurens, Margareta Fredborg, Michael Leff, and Aaron Kibedi Varga.

In 1983, ISHR launched its flagship journal, Rhetorica: A Journal for the History of Rhetoric. By 1988, Rhetorica had already published groundbreaking articles on topics such as Ancient Egyptian and Jewish rhetorics. ISHR and Rhetorica have continued to promote the study of rhetoric in all periods and languages. Biennial conferences have typically alternated between sites and presidents in North America and Europe.

== Publications ==
- Rhetorica: A Journal for the History of Rhetoric
- International Studies in the History of Rhetoric

== Presidents ==
- Brian Vickers (1977-1979)
- James J. Murphy (1979-1981)
- Anton Leeman (1981-1983)
- George A. Kennedy (1982-1985)
- Marc Fumaroli (1985-1987)
- Carl Joachim Classen (1987-1989)
- Nancy Struever (1989-1991)
- Adriano Pennacini (1991-1993)
- Peter France (1993-1995)
- Judith Rice Henderson (1995-1997)
- Marijke Spies (1997-1999)
- Jerzy Axer (1999-2001)
- Tomas Alabaladejo (2001-2003)
- Lawrence Green (2003-2005)
- Laurent Pernot (2005-2007)
- Diene Desrosiers-Bonin (2007-2009)
- Lucia Montefusco Calboli (2009-2011)
- Martin Camargo (2011-2013)
- Manfred Kraus (2013-2015)
- Michael Edwards (2015-2017)
- Malcolm Richardson (2017-2019)
- Mac van der Poel (2019-2022)
- David Mirhady (2022-2024)
- Hanne Roer (2024-2025)
- Robin Reames (2025-2027)

== See also ==
- Rhetoric Society of America
- National Communication Association
