= American philosophy =

Corpus of philosophers of the United States

American philosophy is philosophy produced by American people in the United States of America, part of American culture. The Internet Encyclopedia of Philosophy notes that while it lacks a "core of defining features, American Philosophy can nevertheless be seen as both reflecting and shaping collective American identity over the history of the nation". New England colleges such as Harvard, Yale, and Princeton (today known as Ivy Leagues) have long been influential in producing American philosophy.

Early American philosophy in the 17th and 18th centuries is largely seen as an extension of the European Enlightenment. Colonial America and the American Enlightenment was influenced by the Puritan thought of Samuel Johnson and Jonathan Edwards. The Enlightenment also influenced the philosophy of the American Revolution and Founding Fathers such as Benjamin Franklin and Thomas Jefferson.

A small number of 19th-century philosophies are known as uniquely American in origin, namely pragmatism and transcendentalism, with their most prominent proponents being the philosophers William James and Ralph Waldo Emerson, respectively.

American philosophy since the 20th century is mostly analytic philosophy. (Note: "Without exception, the best philosophy departments in the United States are dominated by analytic philosophy, and among the leading philosophers in the United States, all but a tiny handful would be classified as analytic philosophers.) Some of the most prominent American analytic philosophers are W. V. O. Quine and Saul Kripke.

== 17th century ==
While various Indian tribes (see Indigenous American philosophy) inhabited the territories that would later become the United States, most histories of the American philosophy have traditionally begun with European colonization, especially with the arrival of the English Puritans in New England, such as those aboard the Mayflower who established Plymouth Colony. (Note: There was also notably the arrival of colonists in Jamestown, Virginia.)

=== Settlement ===
Governing documents for the newly established settlements in the American Colonies such as the Mayflower Compact (1620), Fundamental Orders of Connecticut (1639) and Massachusetts Body of Liberties (1641) expressed Puritan Providentialism, emphasizing the relationship between God, the individual, and the community.

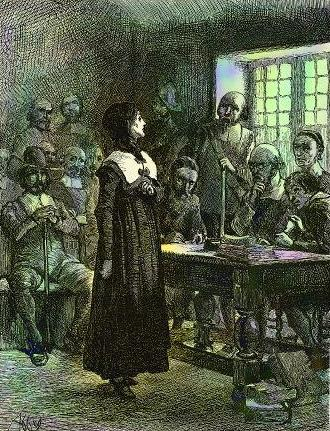
Anne Hutchinson on trial.

America's first university was Harvard College, established in Massachusetts Bay Colony in 1636. The first 100 years or so of college education in the American Colonies were dominated by the Puritan theology of William Ames and "the sixteenth-century logical methods of Petrus Ramus." (Note: Ramus was a French education reformer and Protestant convert.)

Massachusetts Bay Colony governor John Winthrop (1588–1649) emphasized public life over private life. Others, such as Rhode Island co-founder Roger Williams (c. 1603–1683), held that religious tolerance was more integral than trying to achieve religious homogeneity in a community.

=== Antinomian Controversy ===
Minister John Cotton (1585–1652) influenced Anne Hutchinson (1591–1643), a participant in the Antinomian Controversy which disrupted Massachusetts Bay Colony from 1636 to 1638. Hutchinson was put on trial for preferring a covenant of grace to a covenant of works. With encouragement from Roger Williams, Hutchinson and supporters like John Clarke (1609–1676) and William Coddington (c 1601–1678) fled and established Portsmouth, Rhode Island.

=== Salem witch trials ===
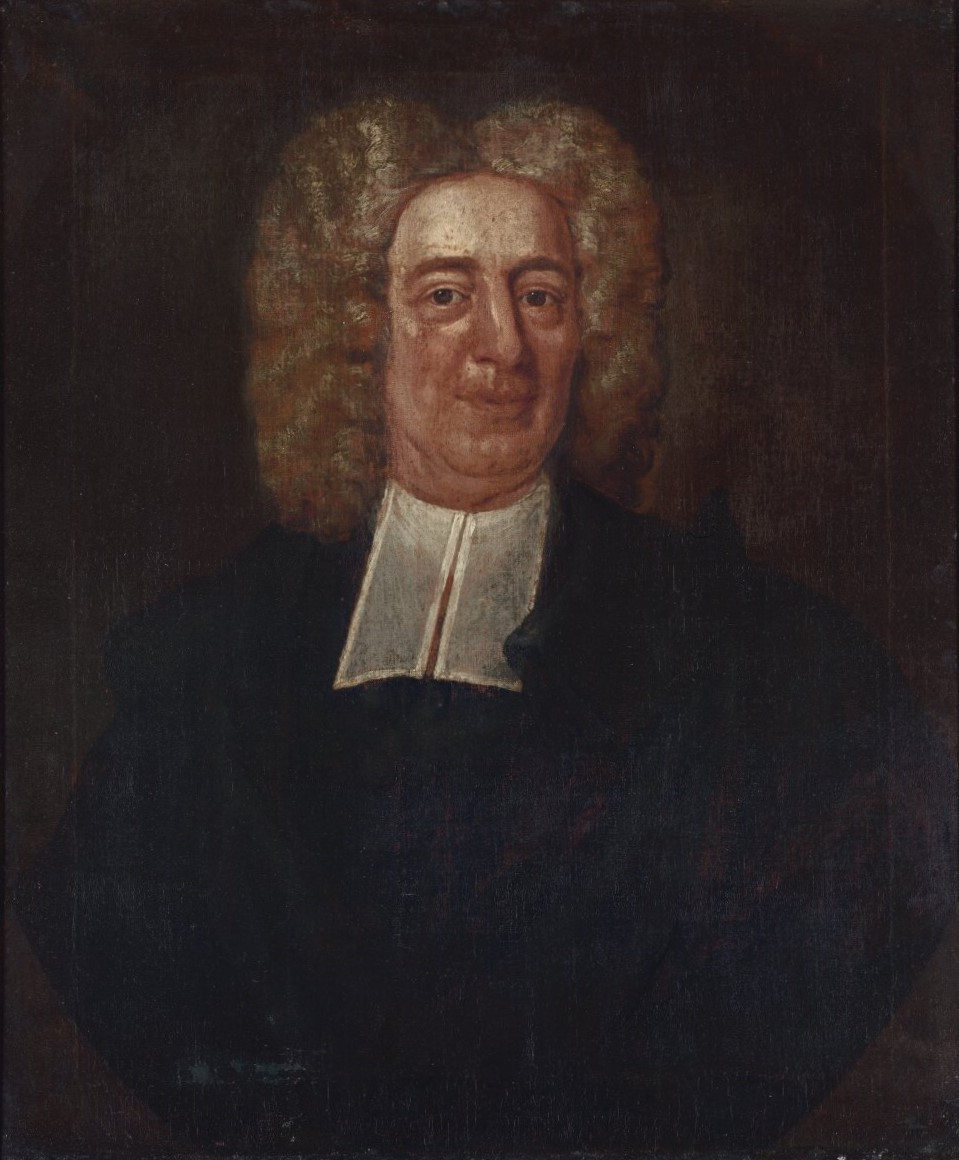
Cotton Mather

Robert Calef (1648–1719) wrote More Wonders of the Invisible World (1698) denouncing the recent Salem witch trials (1692–1693), conducted by Sheriff George Corwin, grandson of Connecticut governor John Winthrop the Younger. As well as fourteen women and five men executed by hanging, Giles Corey was accused of wizardry and killed by pressing from the torture of peine forte et dure.

Calef especially criticized Cotton Mather (1663–1728), who had defended his actions in Wonders of the Invisible World (1693). Mather was an early proponent of smallpox inoculation, (Note: In Virginia, William Byrd II would later also advocate for inoculation of smallpox.) and deeply influenced by the British natural philosophy (or science) of Isaac Newton and Newtonianism. Mather worked on a grand intellectual project he titled Biblia Americana, a commentary and interpretation of the Bible in light of "all of the Learning in the World". Mather influenced Benjamin Franklin (1706–1790), particularly with his book on Christian duty Essays to Do Good (1710).

== 18th century ==
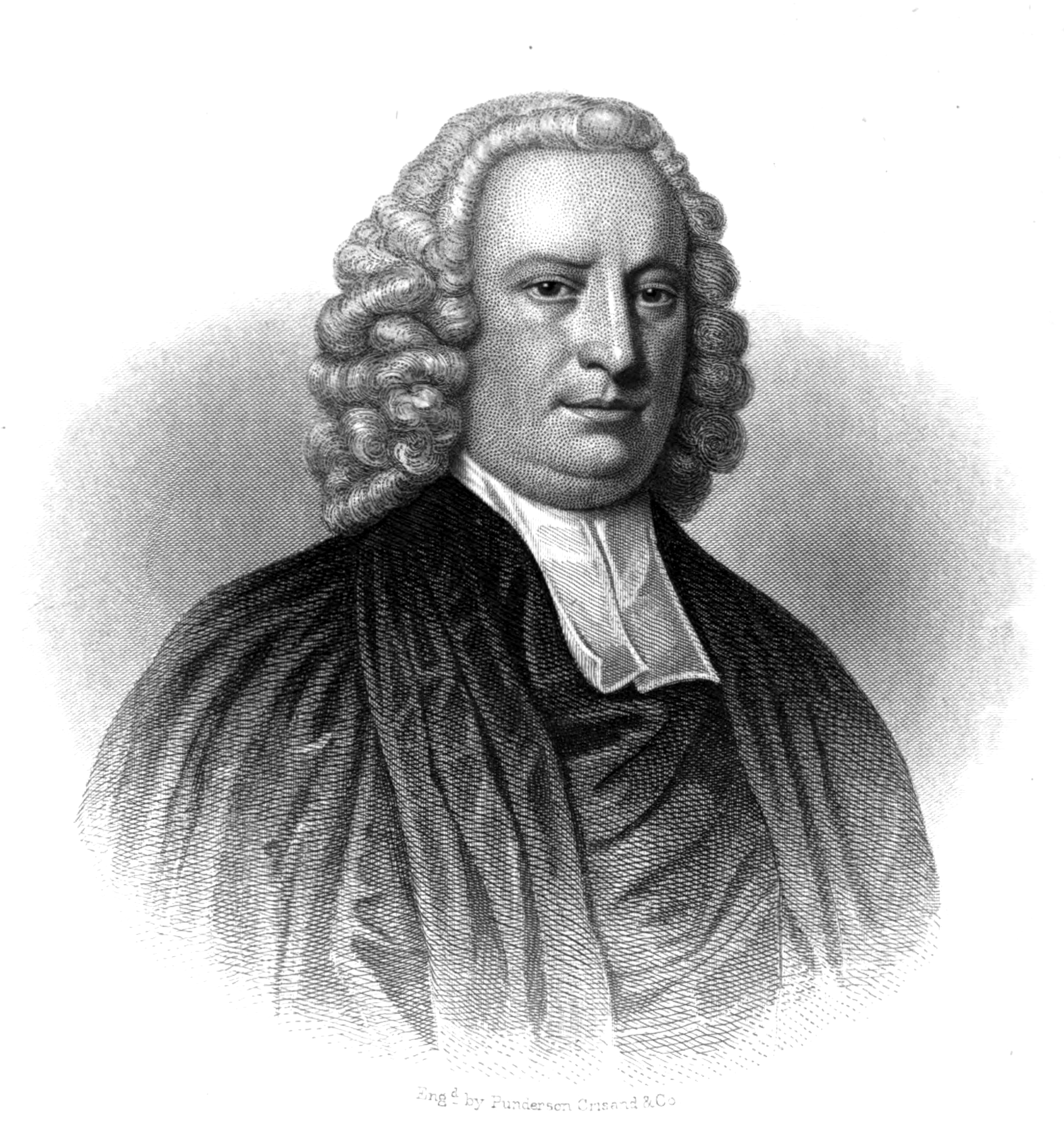
Samuel Johnson

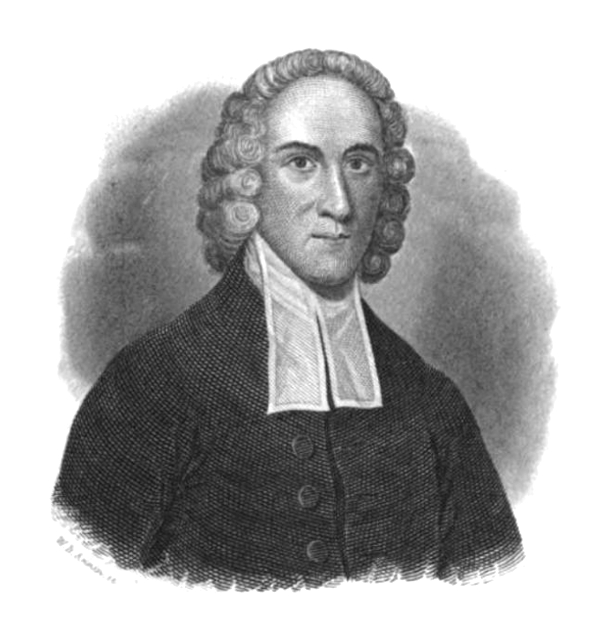
Jonathan Edwards

Yale University was founded in Connecticut in 1701 by a group of Harvard alumni who were also Congregationalist clergymen. The 18th century also saw the introduction of modern philosophy, natural philosophy, and the Enlightenment to colonial America. As a result, Samuel Johnson (1696–1772) and Jonathan Edwards (1703–1758) developed their own American theology and philosophy. "These two brilliant Yale students of those years...exposed the fundamental nature of the problem" of the "incongruities between the old learning and the new."

Both Johnson and Edwards were ordained Congregationalist minister, but Edwards based his Reformed Puritan theology on Calvinist (or Reformed) doctrine, influencing the Great Awakening, while Johnson converted to the Anglican episcopal religion, and based his new American Enlightenment moral philosophy on natural religion.

Both were used "in the tumultuous years of the 1750s and 1770s" to "forge a new intellectual culture for the United States", which led to the Founding Fathers' Revolutionary political thought, and the subsequent Revolutionary War, Declaration of Independence (July 4, 1776) and Constitution of the United States (1788), including the Bill of Rights, guaranteeing personal freedoms such as speech, religion, press, firearms, assembly, and other natural and legal rights.

Late in the century, the Scottish Enlightenment replaced these philosophies, remaining dominant up to the Civil War.

=== American Enlightenment ===
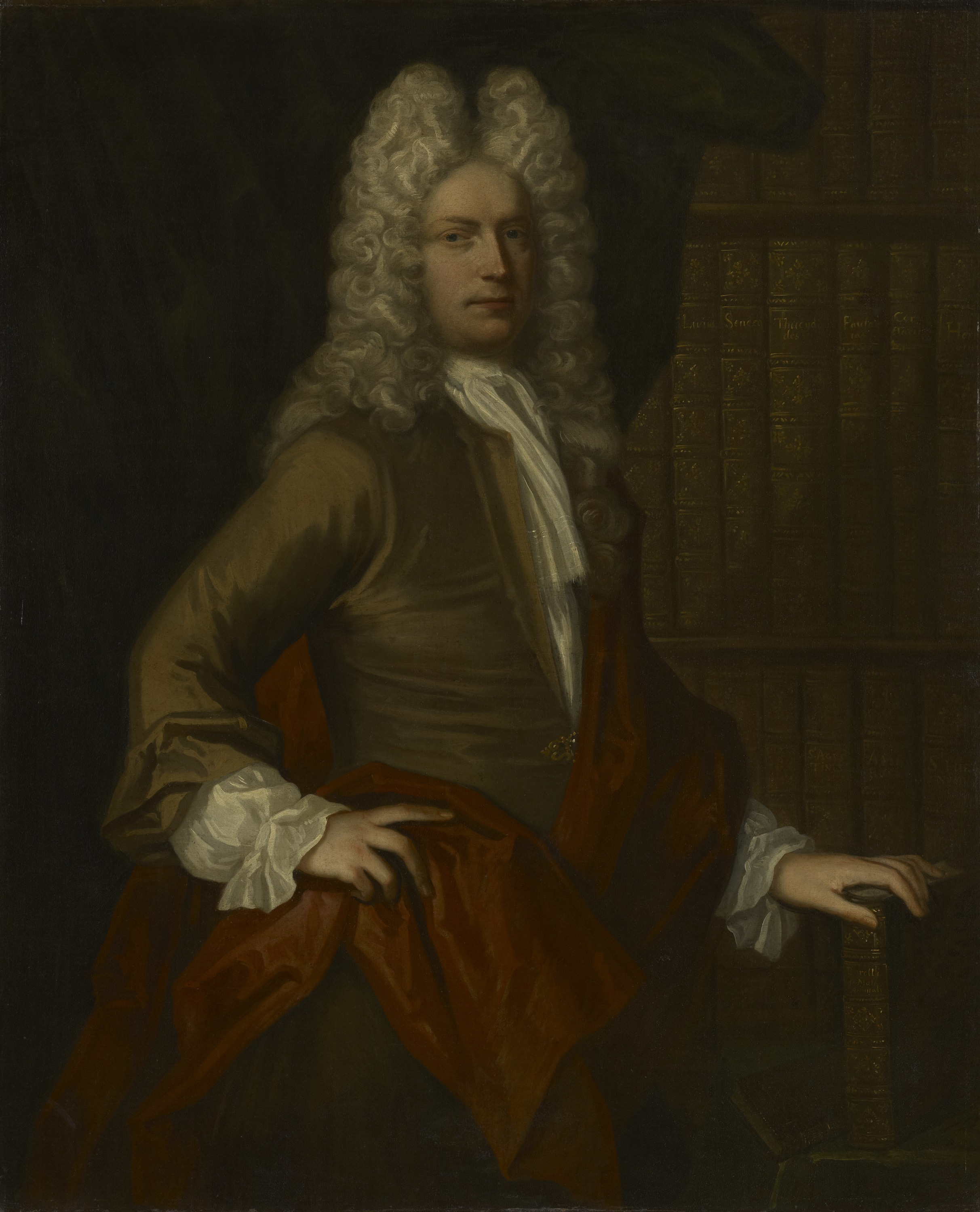
Jeremiah Drummer painting by Godfrey Kneller.

In 1714, a donation of 800 books from England, collected by Colonial Agent Jeremiah Dummer (1681–1739), arrived at Yale. They contained what became known as "The New Learning", including "the works of Locke, Descartes, Newton, Boyle, and Shakespeare", and other Enlightenment era authors previously unknown to the Puritan universities of Harvard and Yale.

They were first studied by Yale graduate student Samuel Johnson, who also read Francis Bacon's Advancement of Learning (1605). Johnson wrote in his Autobiography, "All this was like a flood of day to his low state of mind" and that "he found himself like one at once emerging out of the glimmer of twilight into the full sunshine of open day." He now considered what he had learned at Yale "nothing but the scholastic cobwebs of a few little English and Dutch systems that would hardly now be taken up in the street."

Johnson was appointed tutor at Yale in 1716, starting the American Enlightenment. Samuel Johnson has been called the "Founder of American Philosophy" and the "first important philosopher in colonial America and author of the first philosophy textbook published there". He was also interested in theories of education and knowledge classification schemes, which he used to write encyclopedias, develop college curricula, and create library classification systems.

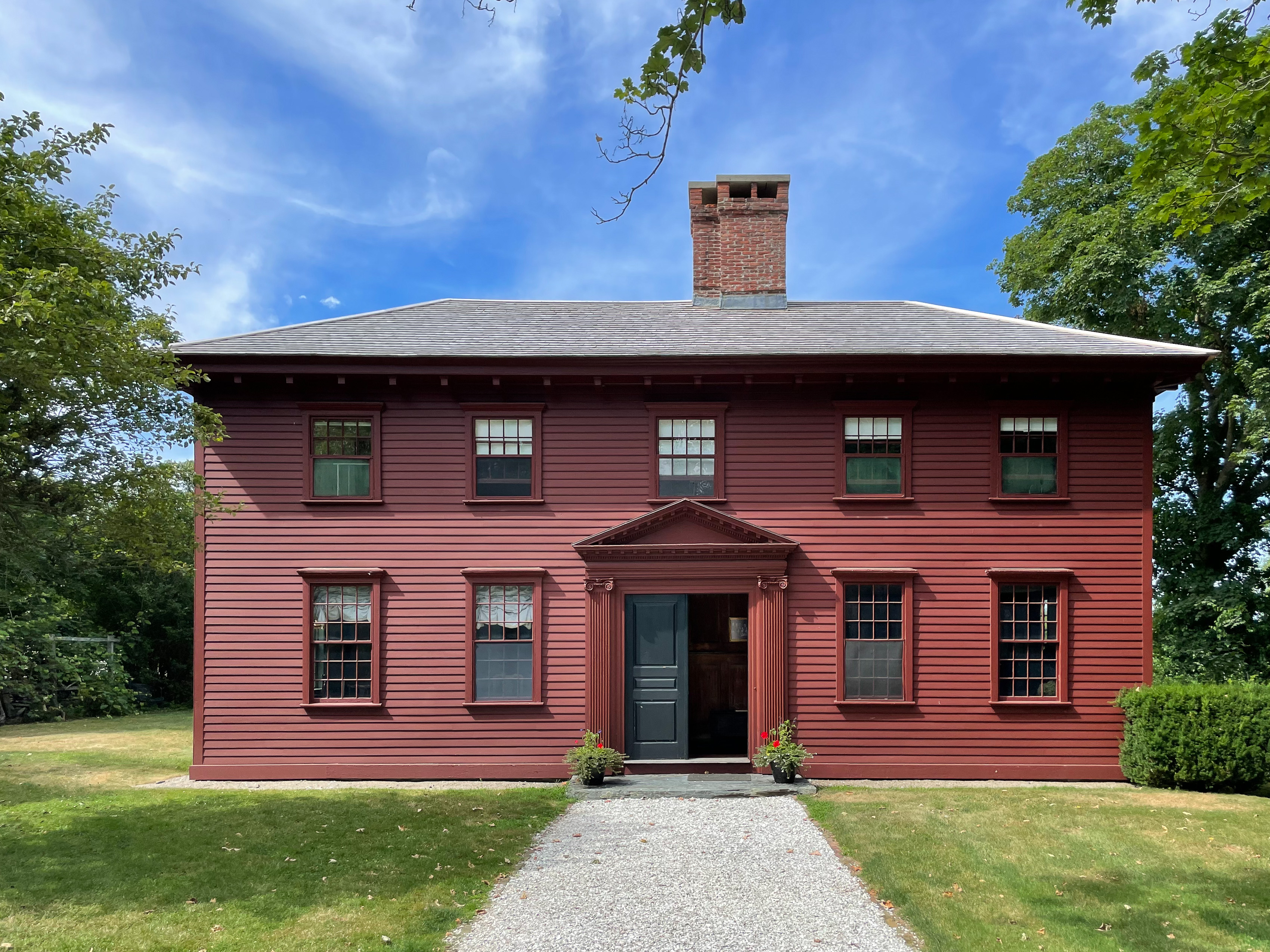
Whitehall, Berkeley's home in present-day Middletown, Rhode Island

Johnson believed "the essence of true religion is morality", and "the problem of denominationalism" could be solved by teaching a non-denominational, common moral philosophy acceptable to all religions. Johnson's moral philosophy was influenced by Descartes and Locke, but more directly by William Wollaston's Religion of Nature Delineated (1722), and the subjective idealist and British empiricist, Bishop of Cloyne George Berkeley, with whom Johnson studied while Berkeley was living in Newport, Rhode Island between 1729 and 1731.

=== Reformed Christianity ===
Jonathan Edwards was "America's most important and original philosophical theologian." Noted for his energetic sermons, such as "Sinners in the Hands of an Angry God" (1741), credited with starting the First Great Awakening, Edwards emphasized "the absolute sovereignty of God and the beauty of God's holiness." Due to Harvard and Yale opposition to the Great Awakening, New Light Presbyterians founded the College of New Jersey (now Princeton University).

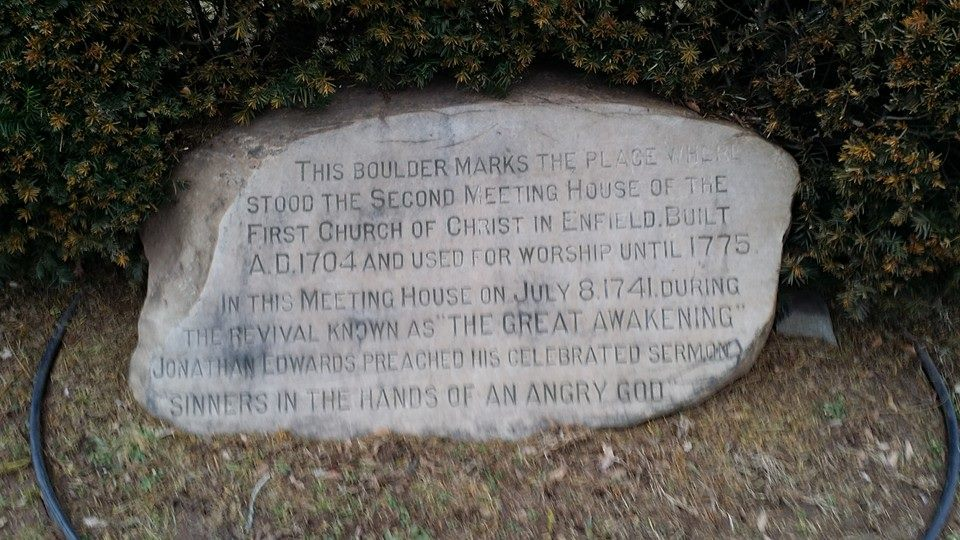
A monument in Enfield, Connecticut commemorating the location where "Sinners in the Hands of an Angry God" was preached.

Edwards was an associate of George Whitefield and a student of Samuel Johnson, who transmitted the influence of Bishop Berkeley. Edwards united a Christian Platonism with an empiricist epistemology, with the aid of British empiricist John Locke's Essay Concerning Human Understanding (1690) and Newtonian physics.

For Edwards, there is an immaterial mind consisting of understanding and will, and understanding leads to his fundamental notion of Resistance, which gives any object its properties. Resistance is the exertion of God's power, and can be seen in Newton's laws of motion, where an object is "unwilling" to change its current state, whether in motion or at rest.

Though Edwards revised Puritan theology using Enlightenment ideas from Berkeley, Locke, and Newton, he remained a Reformed Christian and hard determinist believing in predestination. He rejected freedom of the will, believing we can do as we please, but we cannot please as we please. According to Edwards, neither good works nor self-originating faith leads to salvation, but rather it is the unconditional grace of God which is the sole arbiter of human fortune.

=== American Practical Idealism ===
Johnson rejected Calvinist predestination and believed in free will and natural rights. His original fusion of natural religion and idealism, called "American Practical Idealism", was developed as a seven edition series of college textbooks between 1731 and 1754, such as Elementa Philosophica (1752). These works, and his dialogue Raphael, written at the time of the Stamp Act crisis (1765), include sections on politics, economics, psychology, and teaching children.

Elementa Philosophica contains his moral philosophy, promoted by President Thomas Clap of Yale, Benjamin Franklin and Provost William Smith at The Academy and College of Philadelphia (now the University of Pennsylvania), and taught at King's College (now Columbia University) in New York, which Johnson founded in 1754. These men "first created the idealistic moral philosophy of 'the pursuit of Happiness', and then taught it in American colleges to the generation of men who would become the Founding Fathers."

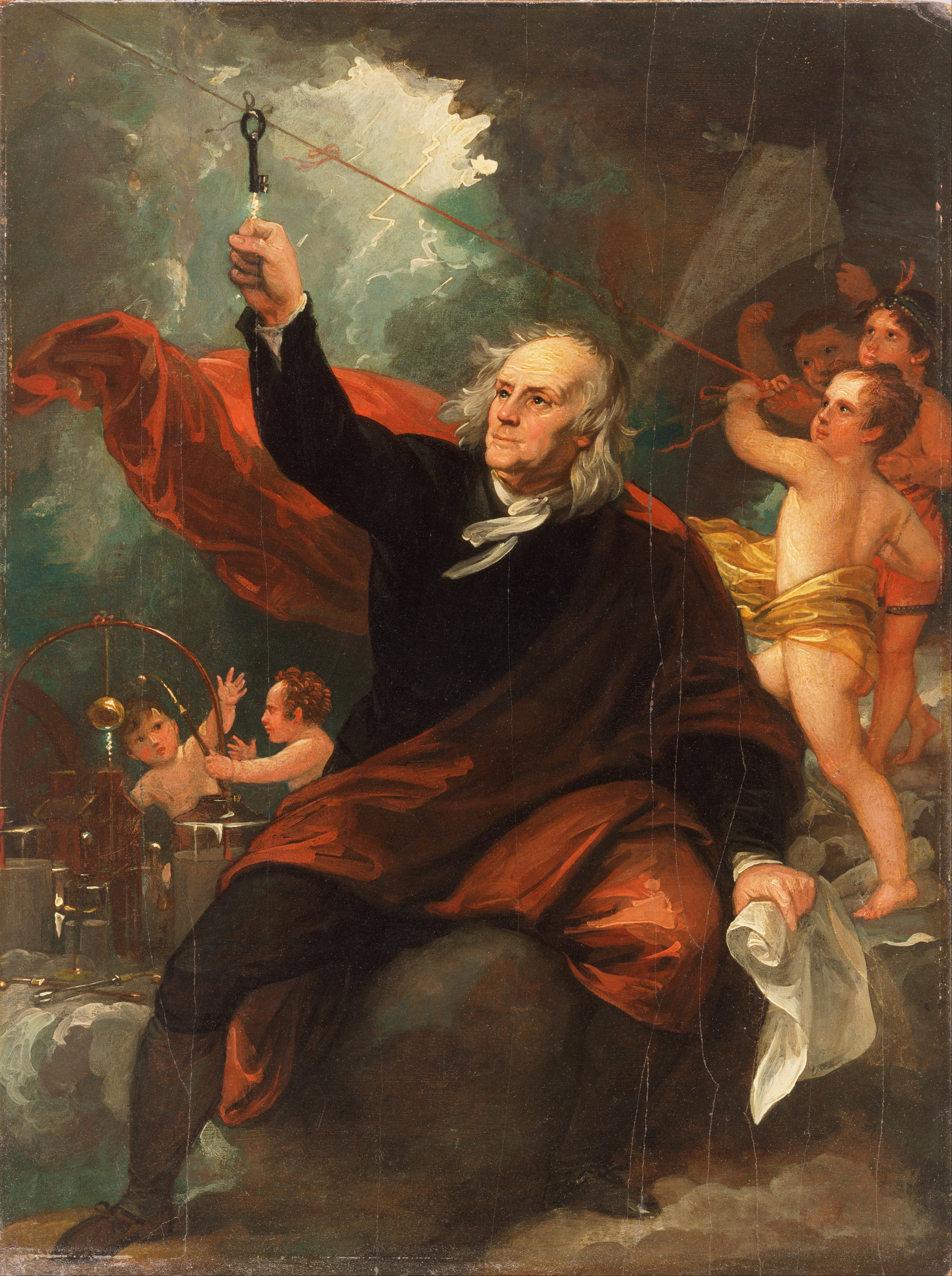
Benjamin Franklin Drawing Electricity from the Sky by Benjamin West

It was influential in its day: it has been estimated that about half of American college students between 1743 and 1776, and over half of the men who discussed the Declaration of Independence, were connected to Johnson's American Practical Idealism moral philosophy. In summary, "in the middle eighteenth century," "the collegians who studied" the new learning and moral philosophy "created new documents of American nationhood."

Three of the Committee of Five who edited the Declaration of Independence were closely connected to Johnson: his friend Benjamin Franklin, his King's College student Robert R. Livingston, and his son William Samuel Johnson's legal protégé and Yale treasurer Roger Sherman. William Samuel Johnson was Chairman of the Committee of Style that wrote the Constitution. (Note: Edits to a draft version are in his hand in the Library of Congress.)

=== Franklin's natural philosophy ===
The meaning of the term "philosophy" was once not as narrowly circumscribed as it is today, including natural philosophy and the broad application of reason to well-being. Back in Europe, publisher Benjamin Franklin was considered America's "first philosopher." Franklin founded the Junto in 1727, and the American Philosophical Society in 1743, with associates like lawyers James Alexander (1691–1756), William Coleman (1704–1769), and Thomas Hopkinson (1709–1751), botanist John Bartram (1699–1777), and silversmith Philip Syng (1703–1789), creator of the Syng inkstand, used to sign the Declaration of Independence and the Constitution. Newton critic Cadwallader Colden (1688–1776) joined a year later.

Franklin was known for his aphorisms found in works like Poor Richard's Almanack. Franklin's philosophical vision was broadly pragmatic. To quote him, "What signifies Philosophy that does not apply to some Use?" In 1752, Franklin proved lightning and electricity were the same phenomenon with his Kite experiment; tying a conductive, metal key to the end of a kite during a thunderstorm, (Note: The key was also tied to a silk cord, which acted as an insulator and allowed him to control the kite without touching the key or the conducting string of wet hemp.) leading to the invention of the lightning rod. (Note: Franklin also invented a pair of swimfins, bifocals, and the Franklin stove.)

=== Founders' political philosophy ===
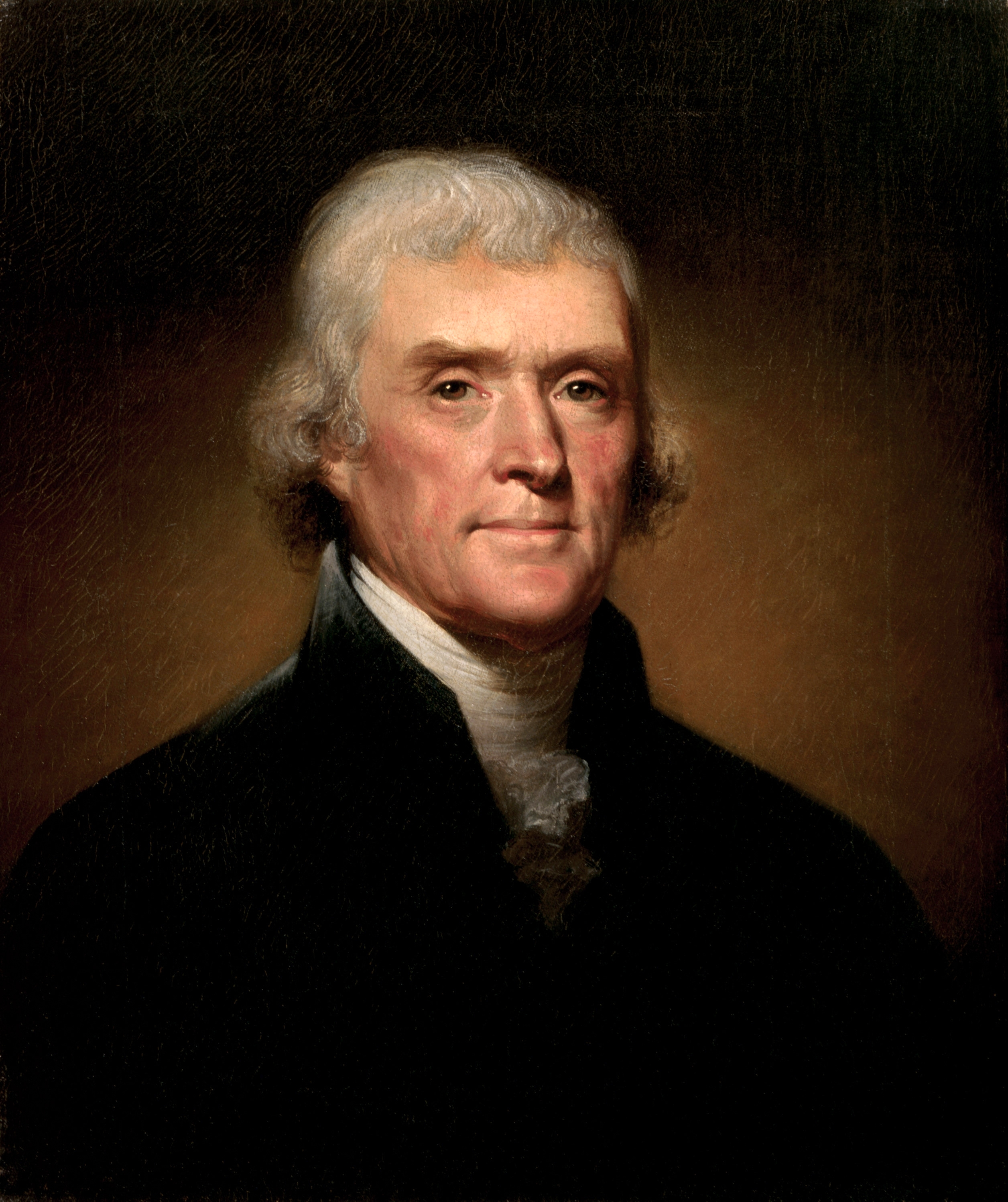
Portrait of Thomas Jefferson by Rembrandt Peale

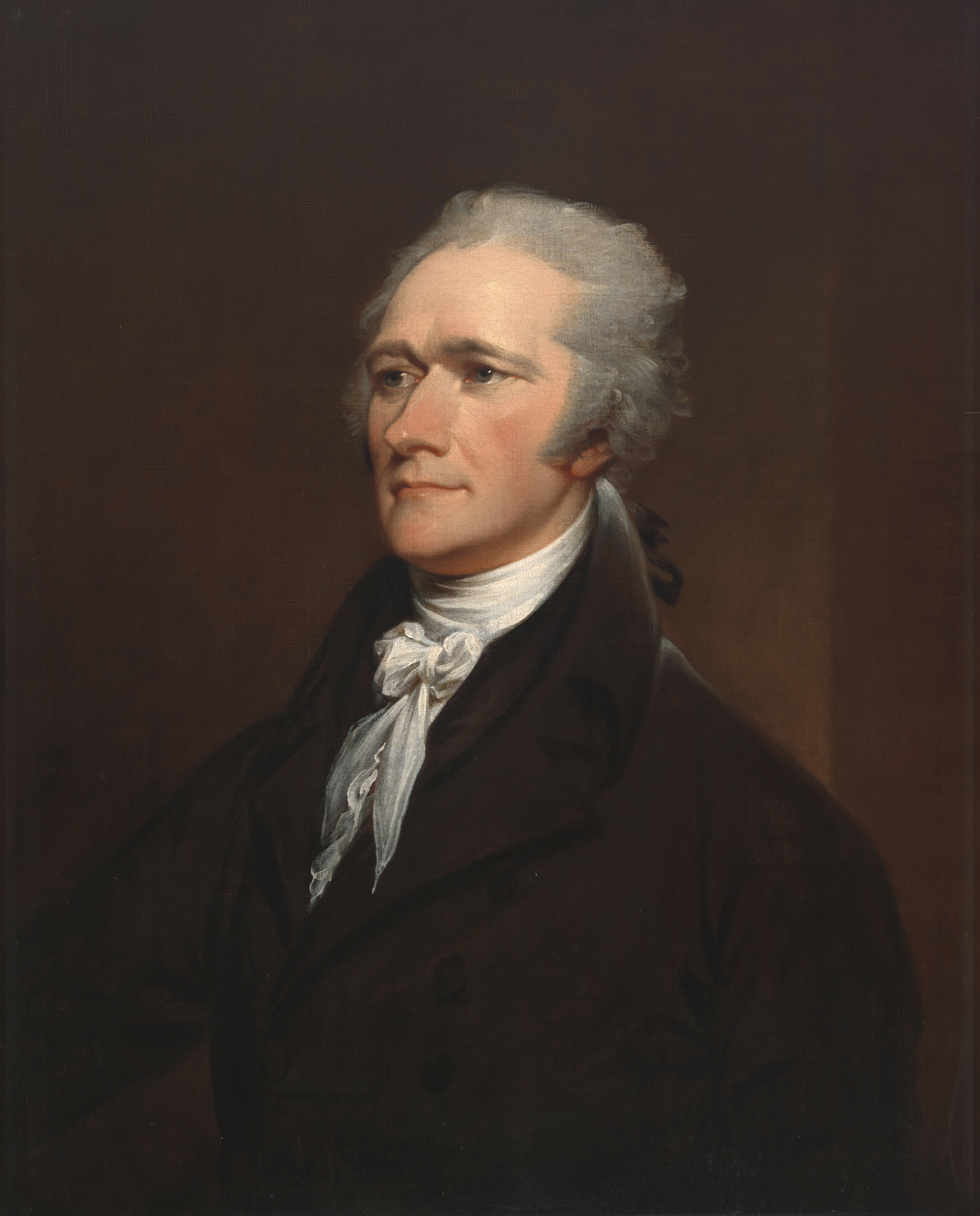
Portrait of Alexander Hamilton by John Trumbull

Around the time of the Stamp Act, interest rose in civil and political philosophy influenced by the European Enlightenment. Many of the Founding Fathers wrote extensively, including John Adams (1735–1826) from Massachusetts, Philadelphians John Dickinson (1732–1808) and Benjamin Franklin, Columbia graduates Alexander Hamilton (1755–1804) and John Jay (1745–1829), and Virginians Thomas Jefferson (1743–1826) and James Madison (1751–1836).

In continuing with the chief concerns of the Puritans in the 17th century, the Founding Fathers debated the interrelationship between God, the individual, and the state. Resulting from this were the Declaration of Independence and the Constitution, for which the surrounding debate between Federalists and Anti-Federalists is found in the writings of Madison, Hamilton, and Jay published as The Federalist Papers.

==== Revolution ====
John Locke's Two Treatises of Government (1689), written to justify the Glorious Revolution (1688), states that government requires the consent of the governed, and that an unjust ruler could be overthrown, thus providing a justification for resistance to King George III and the American Revolution.

Monticello, Jefferson's home

Jefferson learned philosophy from William Small (1734–1775) and George Wythe (1726–1806) at the South's oldest university, the College of William & Mary. (Note: William & Mary had previously had such professors as university founder James Blair and Hugh Jones. The Brafferton building at William & Mary was built in 1723 with funds from the estate of Robert Boyle.) Jefferson was a self-taught architect, and hung portraits of Locke, Bacon, and Newton at his home Monticello near Charlottesville, "the three greatest men the world has ever produced." (Note: John F. Kennedy remarked at a dinner honor Nobel Prize winners: I think this is the most extraordinary collection of talent, of human knowledge, that has ever been gathered together at the White House, with the possible exception of when Thomas Jefferson dined alone. Someone once said that Thomas Jefferson was a gentleman of 32 who could calculate an eclipse, survey an estate, tie an artery, plan an edifice, try a cause, break a horse, and dance the minuet.) Jefferson penned the Declaration of Independence, altering Locke's natural rights of "life, liberty and property" to "life, liberty, and the pursuit of happiness."

Jeffersonianism was a kind of republican agrarianism; Hamiltonianism or the American school was an alternative mercantilist philosophy. Adams, Hamilton, and Jay led the Federalist Party, while Jefferson and Madison led the Democratic-Republican Party. During the Quasi-War (1798–1800) with France, Jefferson and Madison penned the Kentucky and Virginia Resolutions supporting interposition and jury nullification against the Alien and Sedition Acts.

==== Checks and balances ====
The Constitution sets forth a federal and republican form of government marked by a balance of powers, a system of checks and balances between the three branches of government: a judicial branch, an executive branch led by the President, and a legislative branch composed of a bicameral legislature where the House of Representatives is the lower house and the Senate is the upper house. This was influenced especially by French philosophe Baron de Montesquieu's The Spirit of Law (1748).

==== Founders' religion ====
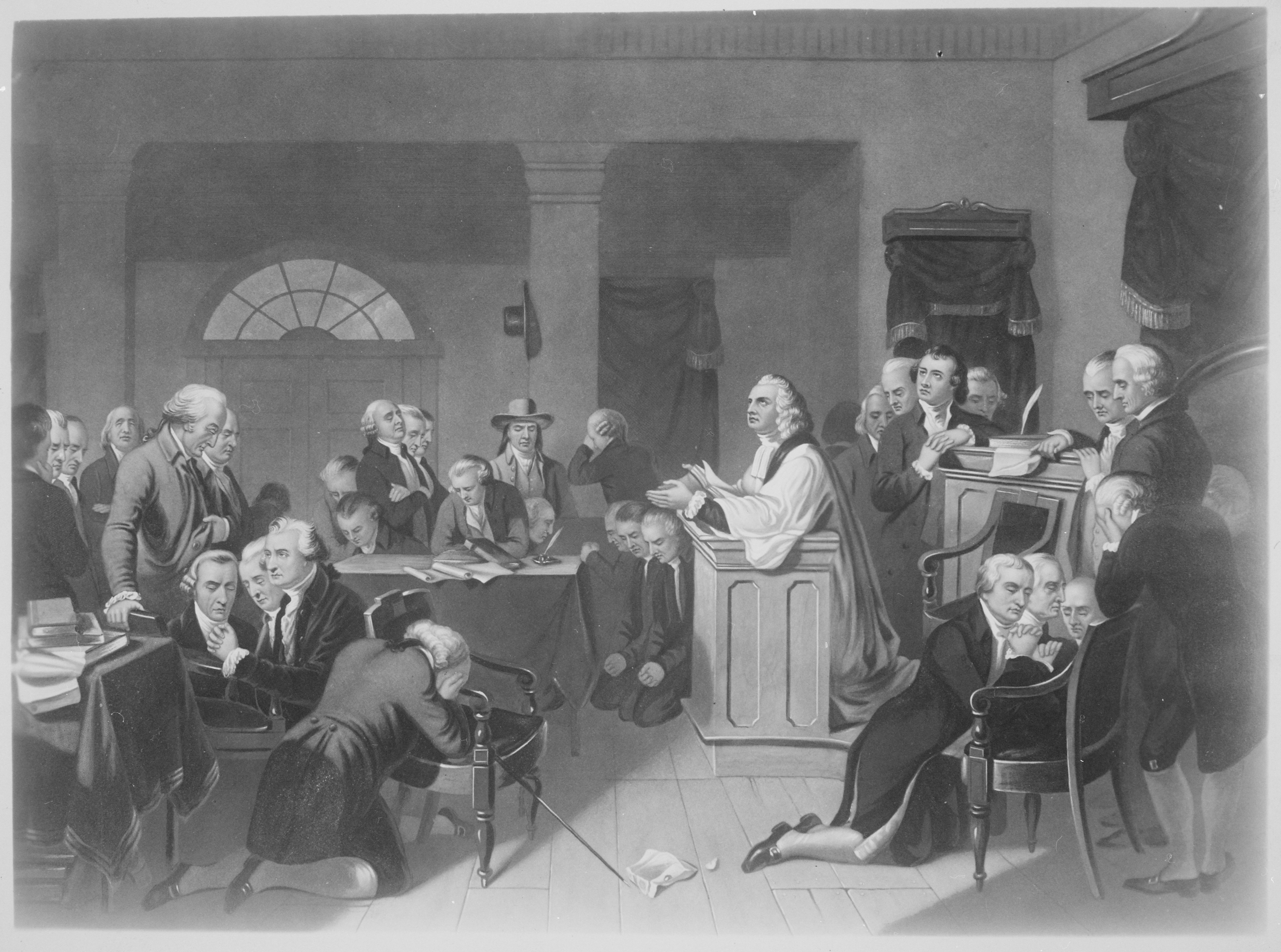
The First Prayer in Congress

Although the Declaration of Independence does contain references to the Creator, the God of Nature, Divine Providence, and the Supreme Judge of the World, the Founding Fathers were not exclusively Christians. Some professed personal concepts of deism, as was characteristic of philosophes Voltaire and Rousseau, or French Revolutionary Robespierre. Wollaston's natural religion was influential, as evidenced by "the Laws of Nature, and Nature's God" and "the pursuit of Happiness" in the Declaration on Independence.

However, an investigation of 106 contributors to the Declaration of Independence found only two men, Franklin and Jefferson, might be called quasi-deists or non-denominational Christians; all the others were publicly members of denominational Christian churches. Even Franklin professed the need for a "public religion" and attended various churches. Jefferson was a vestryman at the evangelical Calvinistical Reformed Church of Charlottesville, a church Jefferson founded and named in 1777, illustrating that the influence of Jonathan Edwards reached even into Virginia.

English deist pamphleteer and revolutionary Thomas Paine (1737–1809) wrote Common Sense (1776), The American Crisis, and Rights of Man (1791). Common Sense justified the Revolution and was "the most incendiary and popular pamphlet of the entire revolutionary era". Though popular in 1776, historian Pauline Maier cautions "Paine's influence was more modest than he claimed and than his more enthusiastic admirers assume." Largely due to his advocacy for deism, Paine died in obscurity.

Boston Tea Party organizer Thomas Young (1731–1777), who named the state of Vermont, was another deist, influencing Ethan Allen (1738–1789), leader of the Green Mountain Boys and author of Reason, the Only Oracle of Man (1785). Elihu Palmer (1764–1806) was also a deist.

=== Scottish Enlightenment influence ===
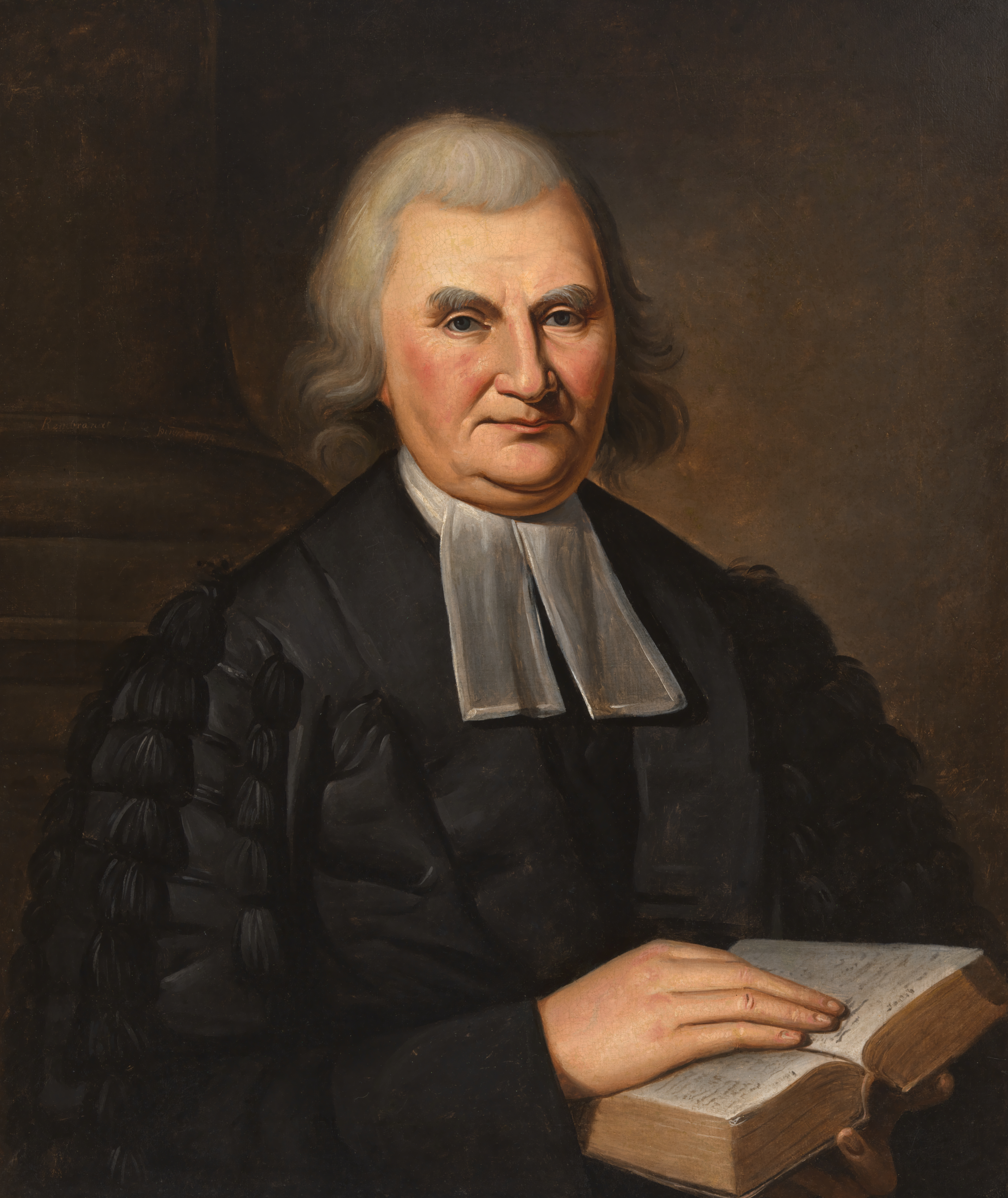
John Witherspoon introduced Scottish philosophy to America.

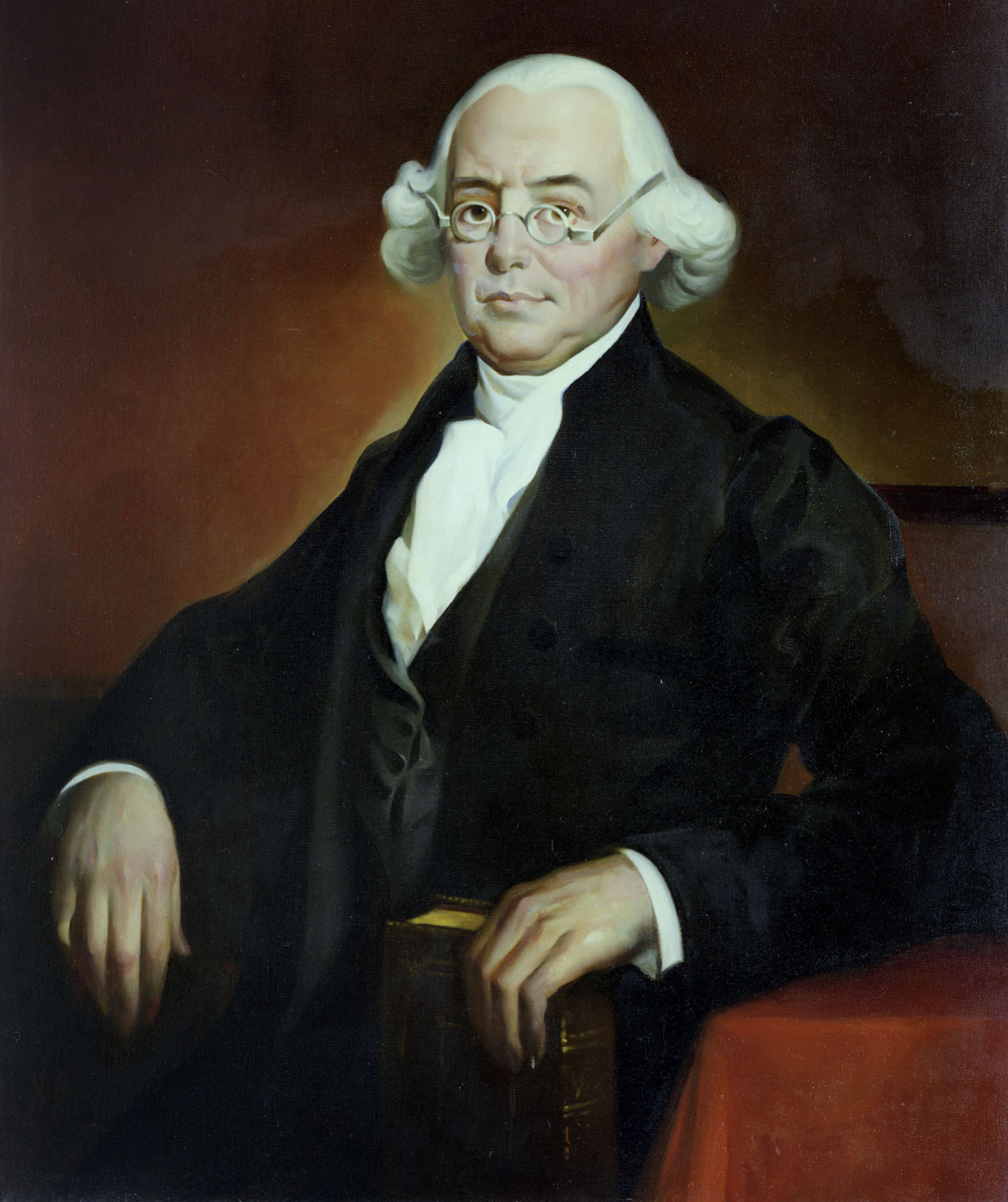
James Wilson was a common-sense realist.

The Scottish Enlightenment was introduced into American colleges by Princeton president and Continental Congress delegate John Witherspoon (1723–1794). Witherspoon was a Presbyterian minister and Scottish immigrant influenced by moral sense theorist and utilitarian Francis Hutcheson, who also influenced John Adams (1735–1826).

Witherspoon arrived at Princeton in 1768, expanded its natural philosophy offerings, and purged the Berkeley adherents from the faculty, including Jonathan Edwards Jr. (1745–1801), and taught his own Hutcheson-inspired philosophy.

The Scottish-American James Wilson (1742–1798) was influenced by Thomas Reid's common sense realism and preferred Reid's justification for a people's right to rebel against an unjust ruler. Wilson felt Reid had shown that Locke's representationalist views led to David Hume's skepticism. Witherspoon's successor Samuel Stanhope Smith (1751–1819) was a dedicated follower of Reid and spread his ideas at Princeton.

Adam Smith wrote the Wealth of Nations (1776), the classic statement of laissez-faire economics. (Note: John Adams' personal copy is housed in the Boston Public Library.) Thomas Pownall (1722–1805) anonymously published an essay for free trade influenced by Smith titled A Memorial Most Humbly Addressed to the Sovereigns of Europe (1780). Smith's Theory of Moral Sentiments (1759) was also influential.

==== Materialism ====
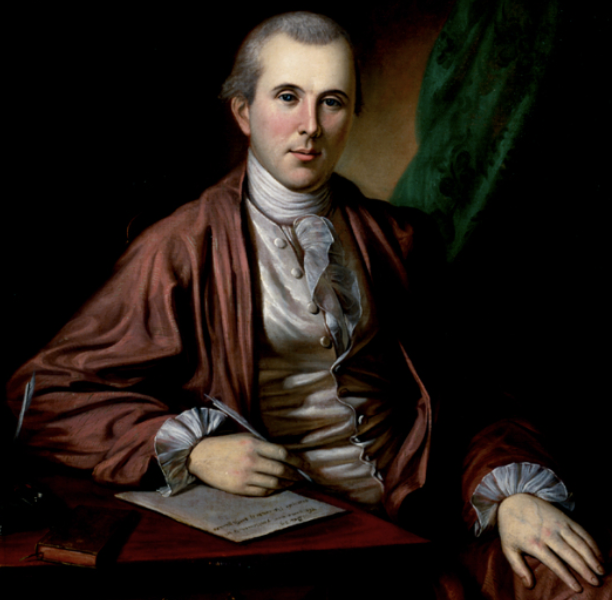
Portrait of Benjamin Rush, by Charles Wilson Peale

David Hume's physician William Cullen taught John Morgan (1735–1789) and Benjamin Rush (1746–1813). Morgan founded the first medical school in America at the College of Philadelphia.

Rush was a materialist who founded Dickinson College, named for John Dickinson. British materialist, chemist, and oxygen discoverer Joseph Priestley (1733–1804) supported the Revolution and fled to America. Chemist, economist, and slavery advocate Thomas Cooper (1759–1839) was also a materialist. So was Transylvania University professor Joseph Buchanan (1785–1829), author of The Philosophy of Human Nature (1812) and father of spiritualist Joseph Rodes Buchanan (1814–1899). (Note: One source calls Joseph Buchanan America's greatest psychologist prior to William James.)

While not a strong influence at the time of the Declaration of Independence, (Note: Some revisionist commentators, including Garry Wills' Inventing America: Jefferson's Declaration of Independence, claimed in the 1970s that this imported Scottish philosophy was the basis for the founding documents of America. However, other historians have questioned this assertion. Ronald Hamowy published a critique of Garry Wills's Inventing America, concluding that "the moment [Wills's] statements are subjected to scrutiny, they appear a mass of confusions, uneducated guesses, and blatant errors of fact." Another investigation of all of the contributors to the United States Declaration of Independence suggests that only Jonathan Witherspoon and John Adams embraced the imported Scottish morality.) afterwards, the Scottish Enlightenment became an alternative to American Practical Idealism, and the dominant moral philosophy in American academia for almost 100 years, until the Civil War.

== 19th century ==
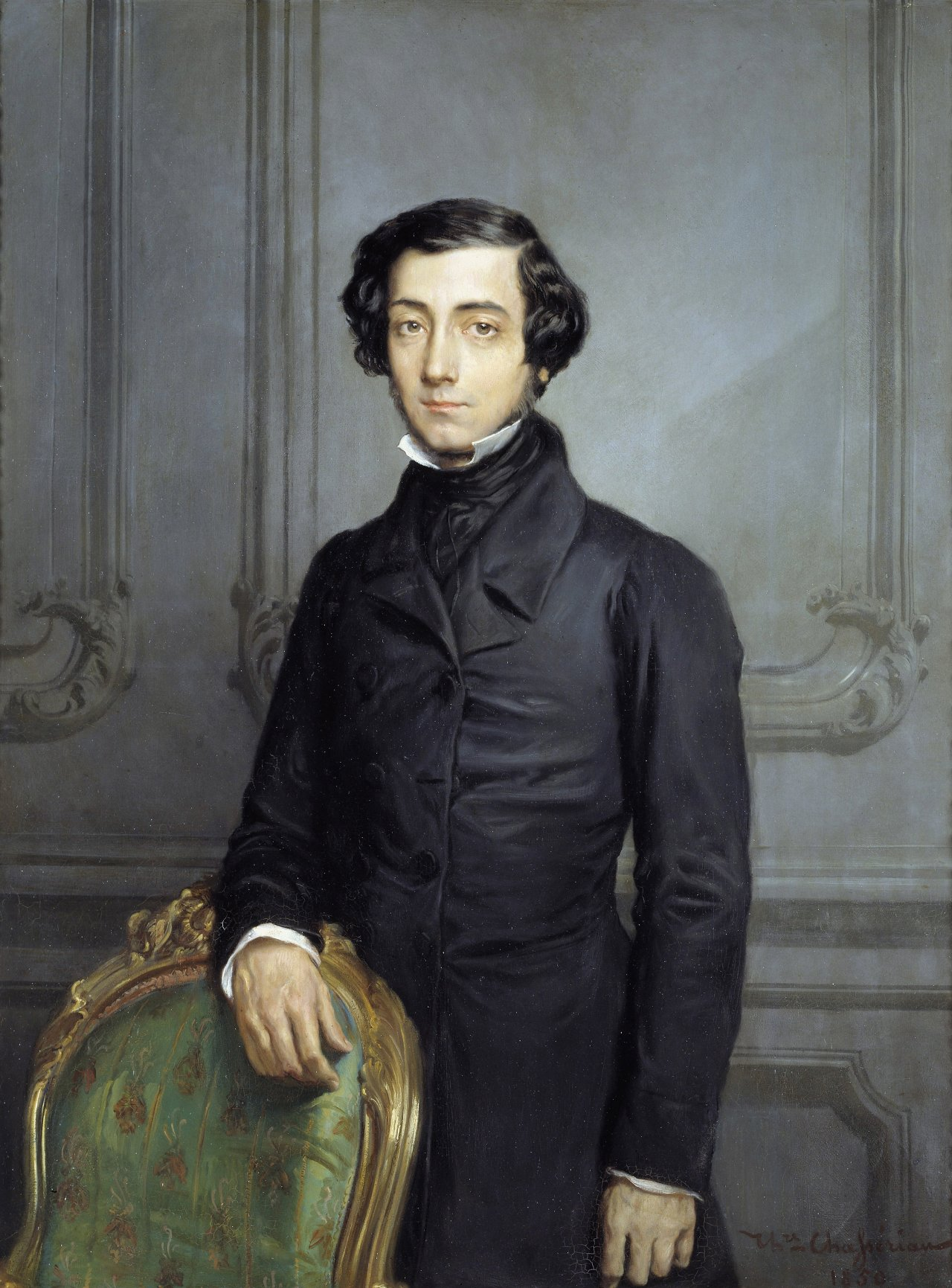
Frenchman Alexis de Tocqueville wrote Democracy in America.

The 19th century saw the rise of German idealism and Romanticism. The American incarnation of Romanticism was transcendentalism. Both transcendentalism and pragmatism are considered uniquely American. American personalism was also influenced by German idealism.

Jefferson acquired the Louisiana Purchase (1803) from France, and Madison led America through the War of 1812 (1812–1814) against Britain. Jefferson, Madison, and James Monroe (1758–1831) founded the secular University of Virginia in 1819.

Jefferson influenced Andrew Jackson (1767–1845), namesake of Jacksonian democracy, which was popular before the Civil War. Frenchman Alexis de Tocqueville published Democracy in America (1835), arguing a democratic revolution had taken place in America.

Jefferson also influenced statesman John C. Calhoun (1782–1850) from South Carolina, who led the states' rights and pro-slavery faction in America. Calhoun was one of the Great Triumvirate dominating American politics in the first half of the 19th century, along with Henry Clay (1777–1852) from Kentucky and Daniel Webster (1782–1852) from New Hampshire.

Both Adams and Jefferson died on America's 50th anniversary, July 4, 1826. Adams's granddaughter married Alexander Bryan Johnson (1786–1867), who anticipated analytic philosophy with A Treatise on Language (1836). Adams's great-grandson through his son John Quincy Adams (1767–1848) was cyclical philosopher of history Brooks Adams (1848–1927), author of The Law of Civilization and Decay (1895).

=== Transcendentalism ===
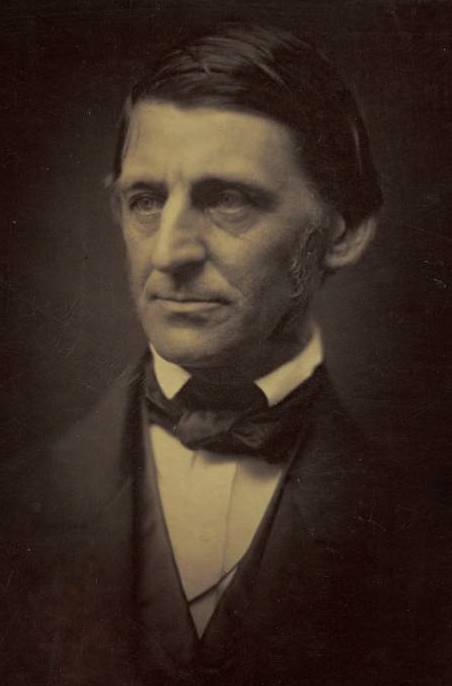
Ralph Waldo Emerson, c. 1857

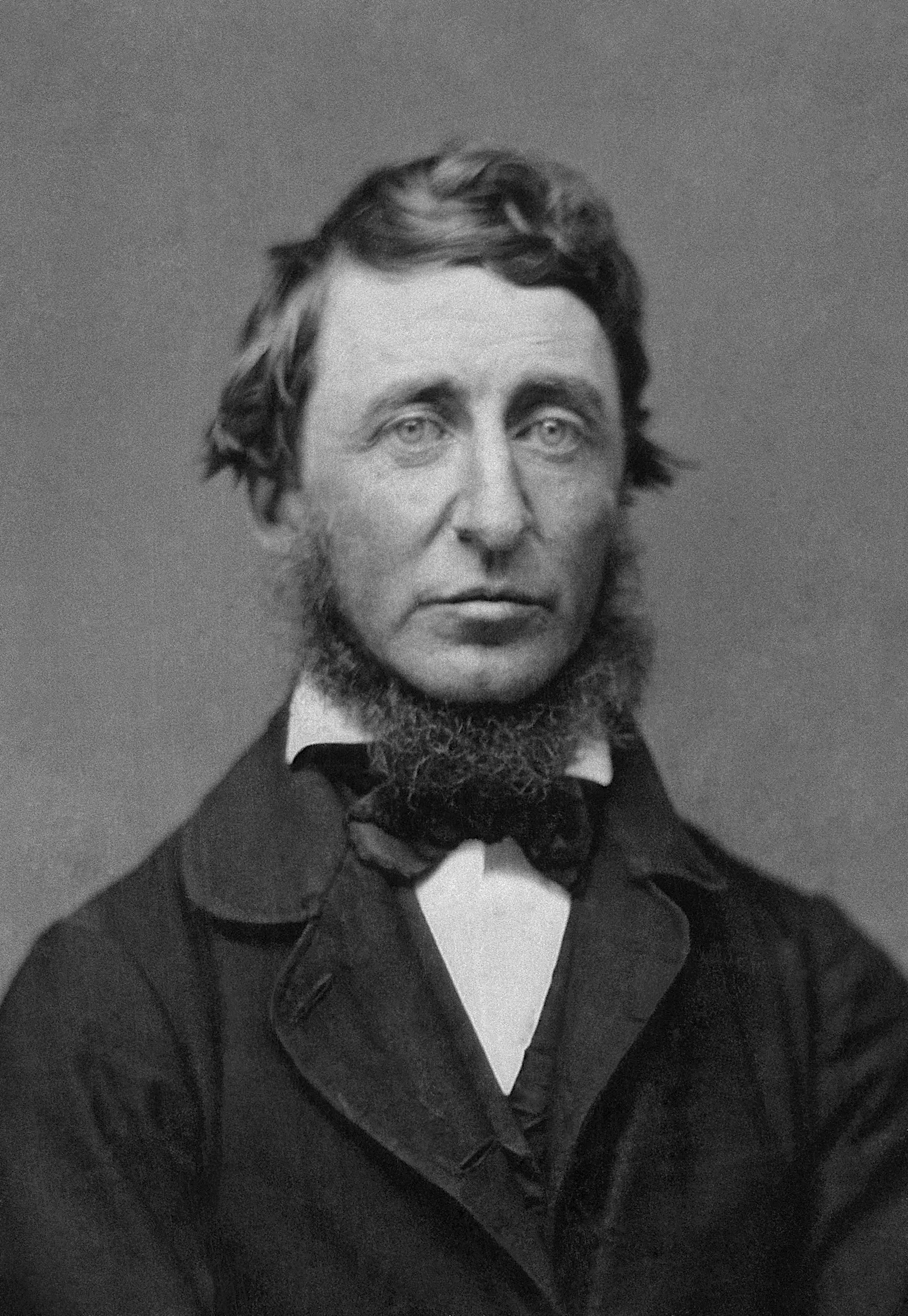
Henry David Thoreau, 1856

American transcendentalism emphasizes subjective experience and is marked by the holistic belief in an ideal, spiritual state that transcends the physical and empirical. It can be viewed as a reaction against modernism, intellectualism, and mechanistic reductionism, which instead desires a return to nature. The transcendentalists believed genuine knowledge is intuitive and personal, arising out of personal immersion and reflection in nature, not industrial progress and scientific advancement, nor the principles and prescriptions of traditional, organized religion.

==== Ralph Waldo Emerson ====
Ralph Waldo Emerson (1803–1882) wrote Nature (1836) and began the Transcendental Club, a conversational club of Harvard Unitarians influenced by William Ellery Channing (1780–1842), such as Frederic Henry Hedge, George Putnam, and George Ripley.

Several more people eventually joined the Transcendental Club, both men and women, including Amos Bronson Alcott, Orestes Brownson, Margaret Fuller and Theodore Parker. Margaret Fuller (1810–1850) edited The Dial, founded in 1840, and translated Johann Peter Eckermann's book on German polymath Johann Wolfgang von Goethe Conversations with Goethe.

==== Henry David Thoreau ====
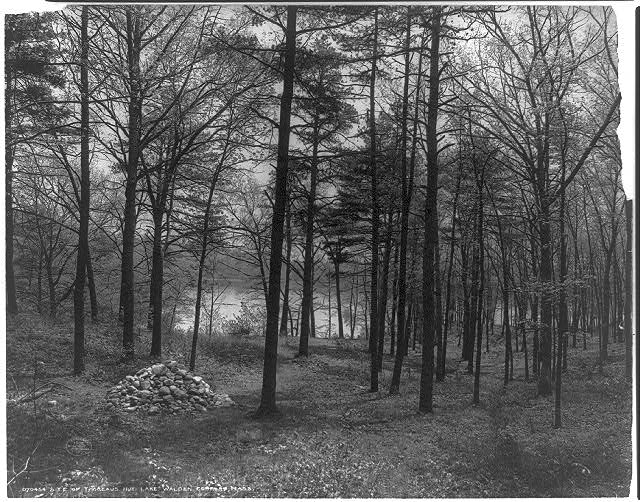
The site of Thoreau's cabin marked by a cairn in 1908

Influenced by the Transcendental Club, Charles Stearns Wheeler (1816–1843) built a shanty at Flints Pond in 1836. Considered the first transcendentalist outdoor living experiment, Wheeler used it during summer vacations from 1836 to 1842.

Henry David Thoreau (1817–1862) stayed at Wheeler's shanty during the summer of 1837 and wished to build his own cabin, which he realized at Walden Pond in 1845. Thoreau's book Walden (1854) shows his attempt to achieve transcendence through immersion in nature and distancing himself from society. Thoreau is also known for his essay "Civil Disobedience" (1849), arguing against compliance with unjust laws.

==== Vermont Transcendentalism ====
University of Vermont president James Marsh (1790–1842) introduced Immanuel Kant and German idealism to America, (Note: Principally through his "Preliminary Essay" to Samuel Taylor Coleridge's Aids to Reflection. Coleridge introduced Kant to British philosophy, and had a deep influence on Emerson.) and was read by Emerson and the Transcendental Club. The first systematic Kantian in America was Union College divine Laurens Perseus Hickok (1798–1888).

Marsh influenced William Greenough Thayer Shedd (1820–1894), who combined transcendentalism with High Calvinism. Marsh's cousin George Perkins Marsh (1801–1882) wrote Man and Nature (1864), which helped launch the modern conservation movement.

=== Personalism ===
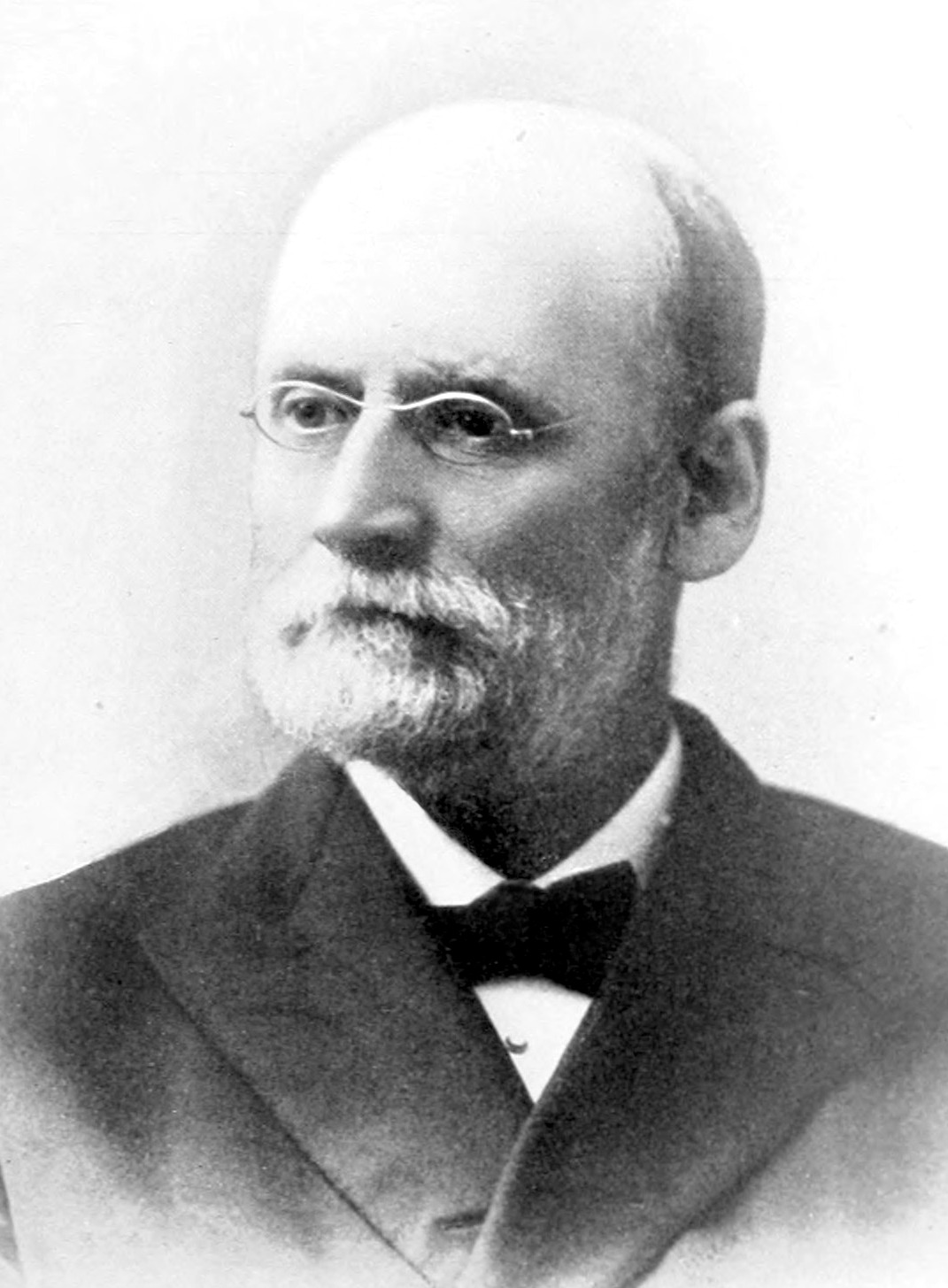
William Torrey Harris, c. 1908

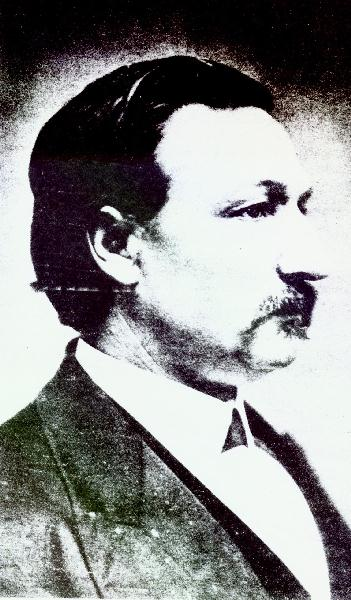
Henry Clay Brockmeyer

Transcendentalism influenced the idealist and anti-materialist St. Louis Hegelians. Their leaders William Torrey Harris (1835–1909) and Henry Clay Brockmeyer (1826–1906) published the Journal of Speculative Philosophy from 1867 to 1893, America's first secular philosophy journal. (Note: A different journal by the same name is published by Penn State University.)

Personalism is distinguished from Hegelian absolute idealism by rejecting that individual persons are absorbed into the absolute. The founder of "personal idealism" or "California personalism" was St. Louis Hegelian George Holmes Howison (1834–1916). "Personalism" simpliciter usually refers to the "Boston personalism" of Borden Parker Bowne (1847–1910), influenced by German Hermann Lotze. Bowne influenced Edgar S. Brightman, Ralph Tyler Flewelling, Francis John McConnell, and Georgia Harkness.

Scottish-American Thomas Davidson (1840–1900) combined St. Louis Hegelianism with Aristotelianism, propounding "apeirotheism", which entailed that each individual has the potential to be a God.

=== Civil War and philosophy ===
A depiction of the Battle of Gettysburg during the Civil War.

The Civil War (1861–1865) came soon after the 1860 election of Republican Abraham Lincoln (1809–1865), with the secession of the Southern states. Lincoln had previously debated Democrat Stephen Douglas (1813–1861), and during the war issued the Emancipation Proclamation and delivered the Gettysburg Address. The Union won the War, whose aftermath saw the dissolution of the Southern Confederacy, the assassination of Lincoln, and the abolition of slavery.

==== Union ====
The 1848 Revolutions brought more German immigration to America with the Forty-eighters, several of whom read philosophy and supported the Union Army, such as Carl Schurz (1829–1906). Fritz Anneke (1818–1872) was a Marxist revolutionary and Union Army officer. Joseph Weydemeyer (1818–1866) was a Marxist revolutionary and Union Army lieutenant colonel. Communist August Willich (1810–1878) fought for the Union. Pediatrician Abraham Jacobi (1830–1919) founded the New York Communist Club along with Friedrich Sorge (1828–1906).

==== Confederacy ====
Alexander Stephens (1812–1883) gave the Cornerstone Speech, stating slavery was the cornerstone of the Confederacy. George Fitzhugh (1806–1881) was a leading pro-slavery intellectual influenced by Scotsman Thomas Carlyle, who in Sociology for the South (1854) and Cannibals All! (1857) rebuked Franklin, Locke, Smith, and the entire liberal tradition, preferring feudalism. James Henley Thornwell (1812–1862) advocated slavery and a "metaphysical" Confederacy. Albert Taylor Bledsoe (1809–1877) is cited by Lost Cause advocates for writing Liberty and Slavery (1856), "the most extensive philosophical treatment of slavery ever produced by a Southern academic". Cavalry general Nathan Bedford Forrest (1821–1877) was the first Grand Wizard of the Reconstruction-era Ku Klux Klan.

=== Darwinism ===
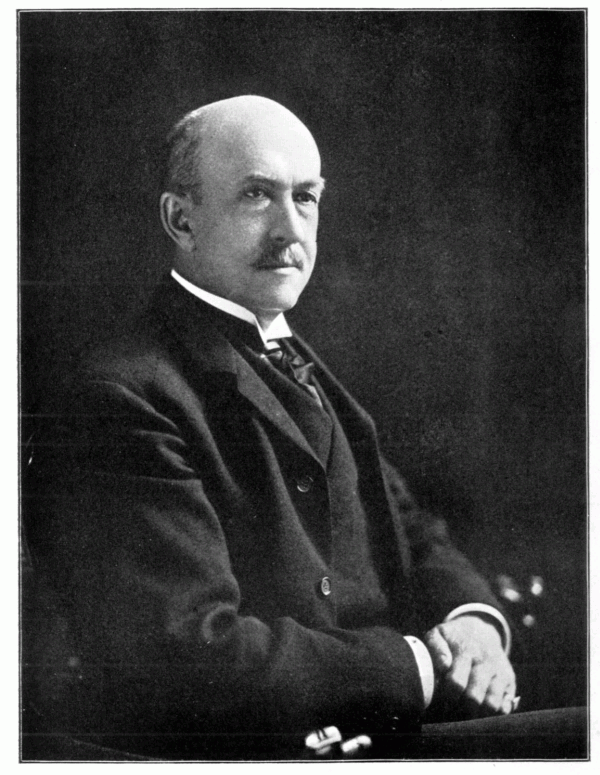
William Graham Sumner

The release of Charles Darwin's theory of evolution in On the Origin of Species (1859) impacted American philosophy, including John Fiske (1842–1901) and Chauncey Wright (1830–1875), who both influenced evolutionary ethics and psychology.

Evolution influenced Briton Herbert Spencer and William Graham Sumner (1840–1910). Spencer coined the oft-misattributed "survival of the fittest" and believed societies were in a beneficial struggle for survival, weeding out the weak, a position called social Darwinism, distinct from the associated eugenics movement. (Note: A notable case of American social Darwinism, influenced by the writings of Friedrich Nietzsche, is Ragnar Redbeard.) Social Darwinism was also closely associated with classical liberalism, individualism, and laissez-faire capitalism.

Spencer influenced Sumner, a gold standard advocate, and social Darwinist along with Scottish-American industrialists and philanthropists Andrew Carnegie and Andrew Mellon, namesakes of Carnegie-Mellon University in Pittsburgh. Sumner espoused anti-imperialism, popularizing the term "ethnocentrism", and was the first sociology course teacher in English.

=== Pragmatism ===
The most influential, uniquely American school of thought is pragmatism, most notably including Charles Sanders Peirce, William James, and John Dewey, all of whom published articles in the Journal of Speculative Philosophy. Pragmatism holds that belief is a disposition to act and that the meaning of a proposition consists in the practical consequences for conduct implied by accepting it as true.

==== Charles Sanders Peirce ====
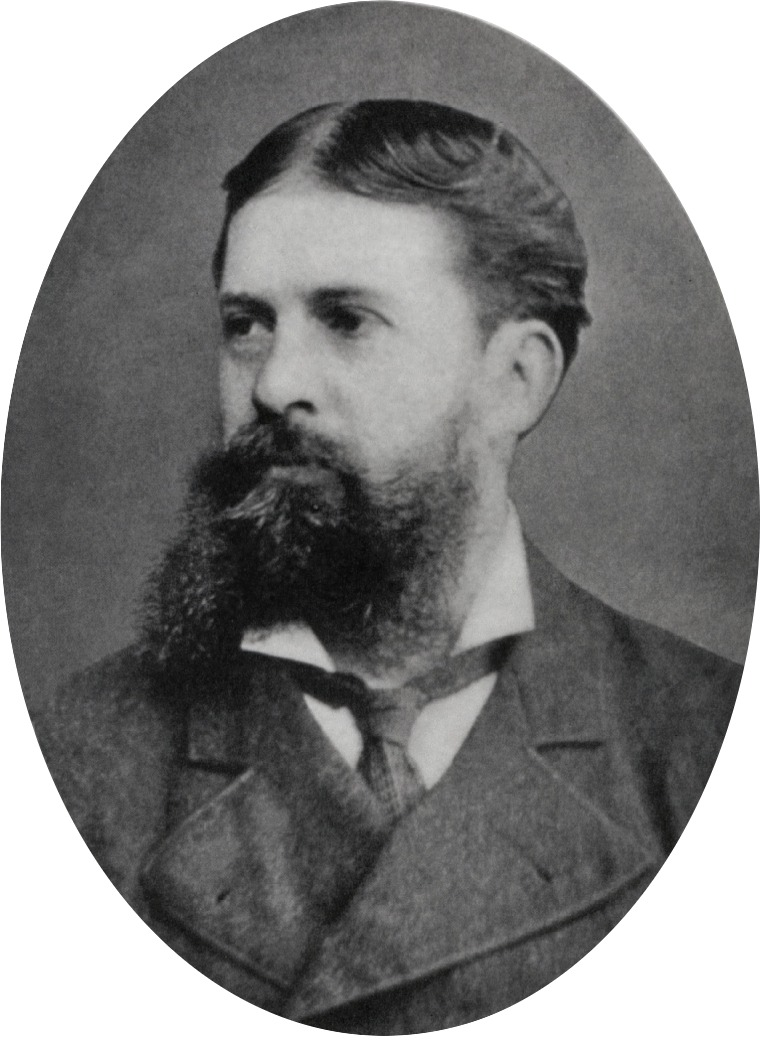
Charles Sanders Peirce, founder of American pragmatism

Harvard philosopher, logician, mathematician, scientist, and polymath Charles Sanders Peirce (1839–1914) coined the term "pragmatism" in the 1870s. The Metaphysical Club included Peirce, Chauncey Wright, future Supreme Court Justice Oliver Wendell Holmes Jr., and William James.

Peirce was a chemist and surveyor working on pendulums, who read Kant, as well as Briton Richard Whately, who started a revival in logic with Elements of Logic (1826), in reaction to the anti-logical aspects of British empiricism. As a logician, Peirce pioneered the logic of relations (or relatives) and conceived of logic gates. (Note: Peirce sympathized with the Confederacy, and used the following syllogism to illustrate the unreliability of traditional forms of logic (for the first premise arguably assumes the conclusion): All Men are equal in their political rights. Negroes are Men. Therefore, negroes are equal in political rights to whites.)

Peirce's philosophy includes a pervasive three-category system, combining a "critical common-sensism" (Scottish common sense realism plus fallibilism), with logic (including Peirce's semiotics, modes of inference, and methods of inquiry), as well as scholastic realism for universals, Christianity, objective idealism influenced by Kant, and belief in the reality of continuity, chance, mechanical necessity, and creative love as principles operative in the cosmos.

In addition to making significant contributions to logic, semiotics (or the study of signs), and mathematics, Peirce wrote the founding documents of pragmatism, "The Fixation of Belief" (1877) and "How to Make Our Ideas Clear" (1878). In 1879, Peirce was appointed logic lecturer at Johns Hopkins University in Baltimore, Maryland.

In "The Fixation of Belief," Peirce argues for the scientific method's superiority in settling belief on theoretical questions. In "How to Make Our Ideas Clear", Peirce harkens back to Descartes' notion of "clear and distinct ideas", and sums up pragmatism by what he called the pragmatic maxim: "Consider what effects, that might conceivably have practical bearings, we conceive the object of our conception to have. Then, our conception of these effects is the whole of our conception of the object". The meaning of a concept is equivalent to its practical implications, as a method of experimental mental reflection. Peirce coined abduction as distinct from induction and deduction.

In semiotics, the first two major theories are those of Peirce and Swiss theorist Ferdinand de Saussure. As a mathematician, Peirce was a founder of statistics, and a frequentist about probability. Peirce was also interested in scientific classification.

C. I. Lewis wrote, "The contributions of C. S. Peirce to symbolic logic are more numerous and varied than those of any other writer—at least in the nineteenth century." Paul Weiss wrote Peirce was "the most original and versatile of America's philosophers and America's greatest logician". British philosopher Bertrand Russell wrote Peirce "was one of the most original minds of the later nineteenth century and certainly the greatest American thinker ever".

==== William James ====
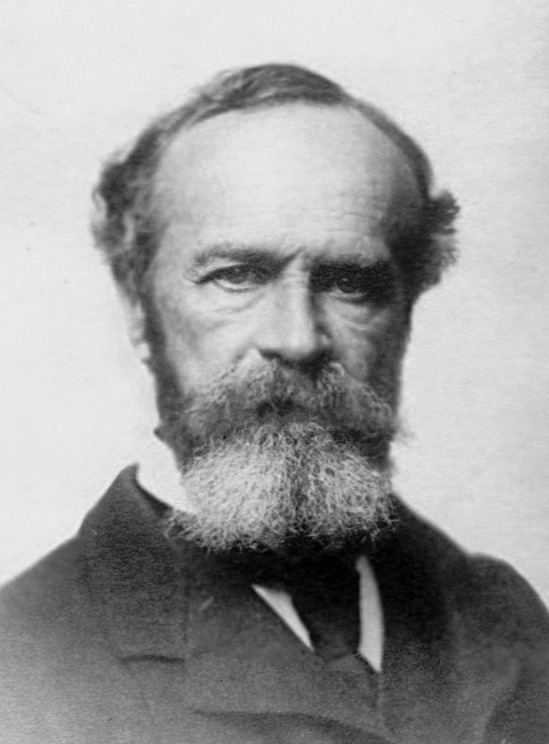
William James, an American pragmatist and psychologist

William James (1842–1910) was the most famous American philosopher of his time. He was the brother of novelist Henry James, and son of Swedenborgian mystic Henry James, Sr. James started Harvard's psychology department, (Note: James is commonly credited with the term "stream of consciousness.") influencing psychologists G. Stanley Hall, William McDougall, and Mary Whiton Calkins.

James is best known as the author of The Varieties of Religious Experience (1902), his monumental tome The Principles of Psychology (1890), and his lecture "The Will to Believe" (1896). James, along with Peirce, saw pragmatism as embodying familiar attitudes, elaborated into a radical, new philosophical method. In Pragmatism: A New Name for Some Old Ways of Thinking (1910), James paraphrased Peirce's pragmatic maxim as follows:

[T]he tangible fact at the root of all our thought-distinctions, however subtle, is that there is no one of them so fine as to consist in anything but a possible difference of practice. To attain perfect clearness in our thoughts of an object, then, we need only consider what conceivable effects of a practical kind the object may involve — what sensations we are to expect from it, and what reactions we must prepare.

James further characterized pragmatism as not only a method of clarifying ideas, but also as endorsing a particular theory of truth. Peirce rejected this latter move by James, preferring to describe the pragmatic maxim only as a methodological stance. (Note: In 1905, hoping to distinguish his own views from later writers, Peirce coined the term "pragmaticism", stating it was "ugly enough to be safe from kidnappers.") James was critical of the correspondence theory of truth.

James is also known for his radical empiricism, which asserts that relations between objects are as real as the objects themselves. James later adopted neutral monism, the view that the ultimate reality is of one kind, neither mental nor physical. James called Dickinson S. Miller (1868–1963) "my most penetrating critic and intimate enemy." James influenced British pragmatist F. C. S. Schiller.

=== Absolute idealism ===
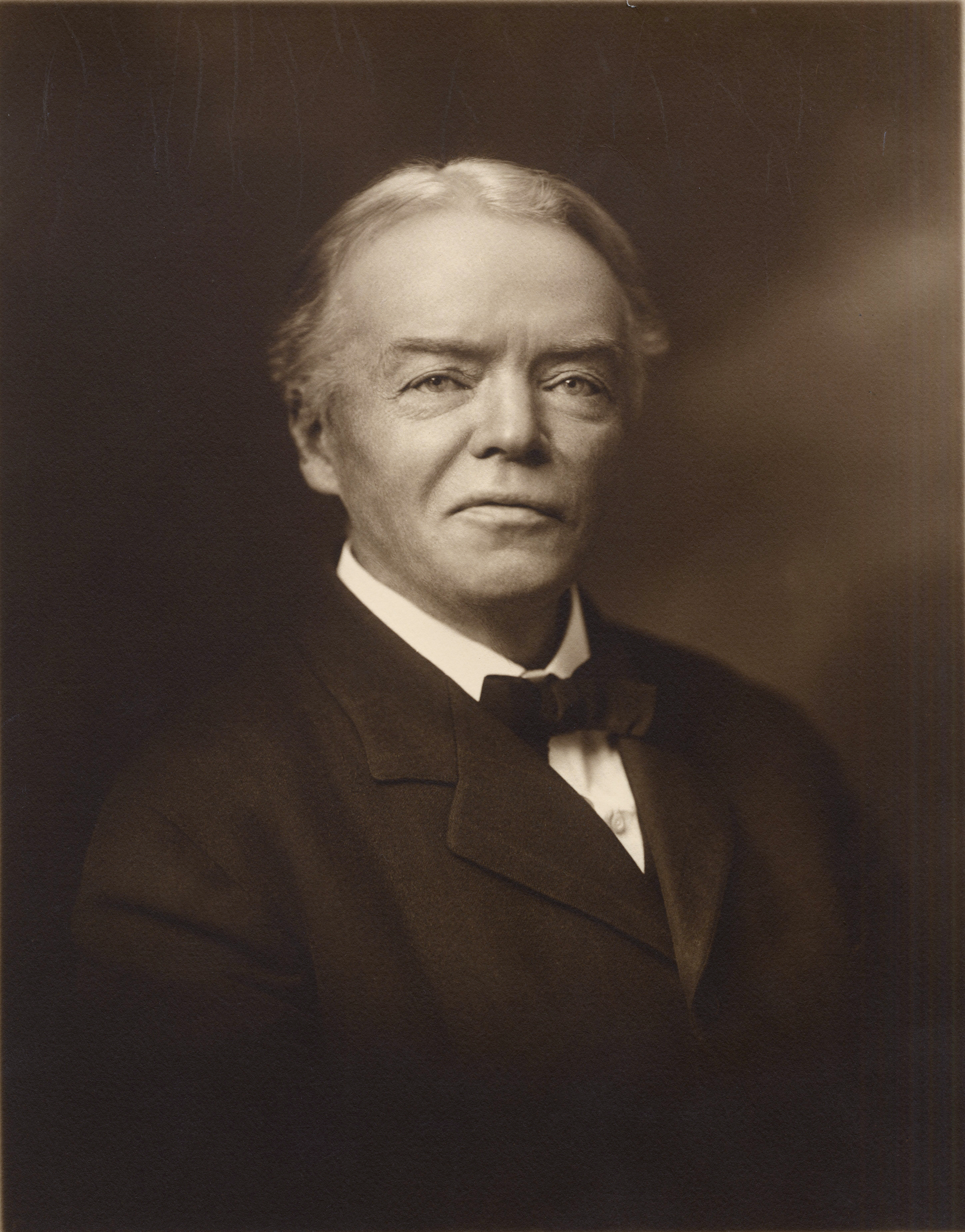
Josiah Royce was America's most famous advocate of idealism.

The most prominent advocate of American idealism was the absolute idealist and Harvard philosopher Josiah Royce (1855–1916). As Royce puts it, "the world is...such stuff as ideas are made of." Royce wrote such works as The Religious Aspect of Philosophy (1885), The Spirit of Modern Philosophy (1892), The World and the Individual (1899–1901), The Philosophy of Loyalty (1908), and The Problem of Christianity (1913). Royce was a student of Peirce at Johns Hopkins, and published in the Journal of Speculative Philosophy.

William Ernest Hocking (1873–1966) followed Royce at Harvard. Royce also taught logician Henry M. Sheffer (1882–1964), notable for the Sheffer stroke.

According to Bertrand Russell, by the end of the nineteenth century, "the leading academic philosophers, both in America and Britain, were largely Hegelian". Absolute idealist and Cornell University professor James Edwin Creighton (1861–1924) founded the American Philosophical Association in 1900.

== 20th century ==
The 20th century saw the increase of analytic philosophy in America. World War I (1914–1918) and World War II (1939–1945) crystallized the split between analytic and continental philosophy. Existentialism and phenomenology, while very popular in Europe, never achieved the same level of popularity in America. H. L. Mencken (1880–1956) introduced Friedrich Nietzsche to America with The Philosophy of Friedrich Nietzsche (1908). Mencken thought Nietzsche's philosophy was exemplified by Theodore Roosevelt (1858–1919). Woodrow Wilson (1856–1924) supported the Fourteen Points and optimistic, liberal internationalist Wilsonian idealism after World War I. Calvin Coolidge (1872–1933) was taught by Amherst neo-Hegelian Charles Edward Garman (1850–1907).

=== 20th-century pragmatism ===
==== John Dewey ====
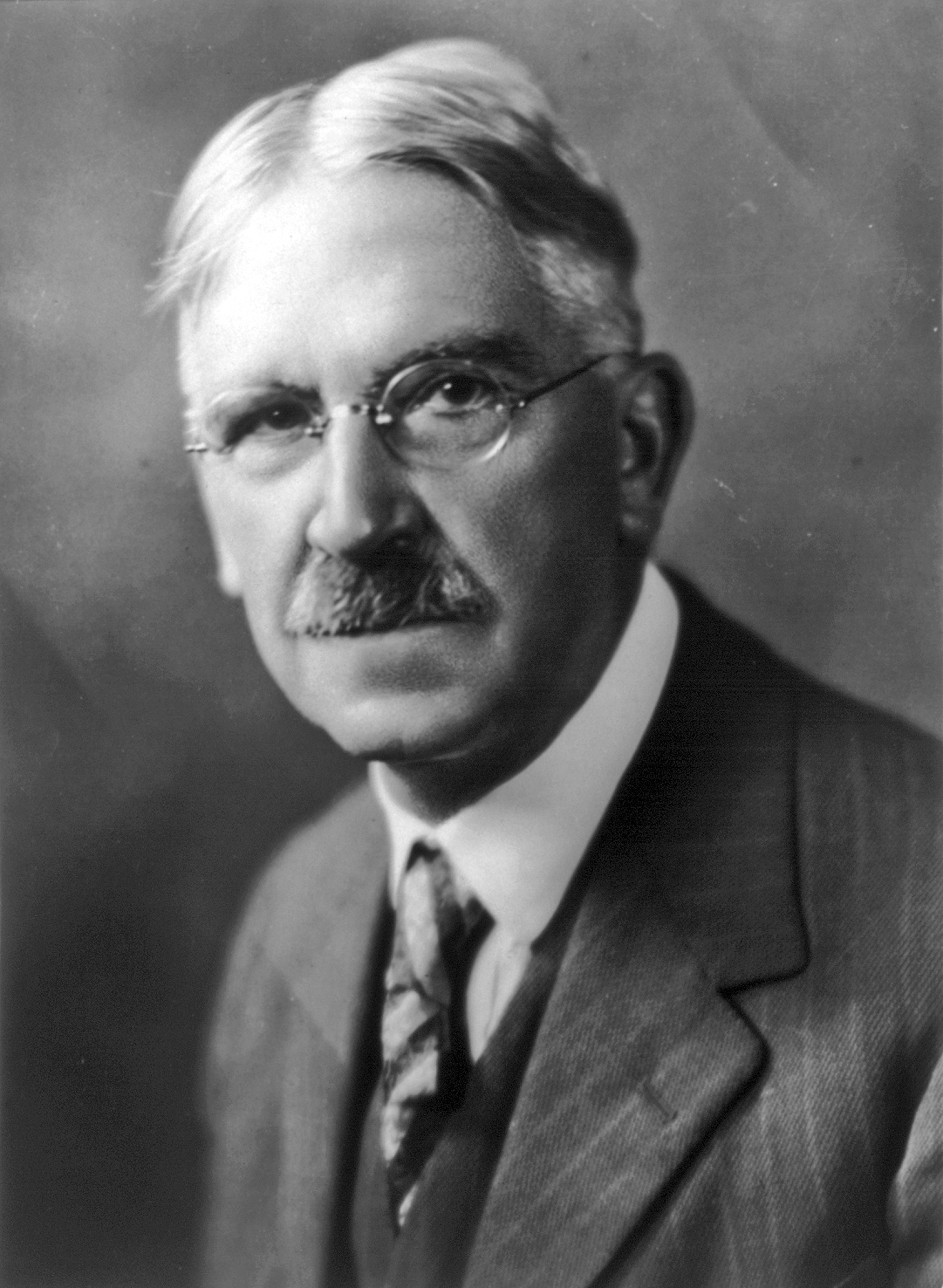
John Dewey, pragmatist and philosopher of education.

John Dewey (1859–1952) from Vermont studied under Peirce at Johns Hopkins University. He was a pragmatist engaged in the academic work of Peirce and James, but he also wrote extensively on politics and society, and his presence in the public sphere was much greater than theirs.

Dewey was a founder of functional psychology and leading figure of progressive education, penning Democracy and Education (1916). Dewey thought schooling was usually unnecessarily long and formal, and children learn better by doing, or engaging in real-life activities. (Note: For example, in mathematics, students could learn by figuring out proportions in cooking, or seeing how long it takes to travel distances with certain modes of transportation.)

Dewey believed in pragmatic ethics and moral progress. Dewey advocated democracy and argued against the individualism of classical liberalism, asserting that social institutions are not "means for obtaining something for individuals. They are means for creating individuals." He held individuals should not be accommodated by social institutions, rather social institutions shape the individual, and so are a means of creating individuals and promoting individual freedom.

Dewey also wrote on aesthetics, arguing art was a holistic experience in Art as Experience (1934).

==== George Herbert Mead ====
George Herbert Mead (1863–1931) was a pragmatist and sociologist influenced by Dewey and Charles Horton Cooley. Mead wrote Mind, Self and Society (1934) and was known for his theory of symbolic interactionism and social behaviorism, which influenced the Chicago school.

==== W. E. B. Du Bois ====
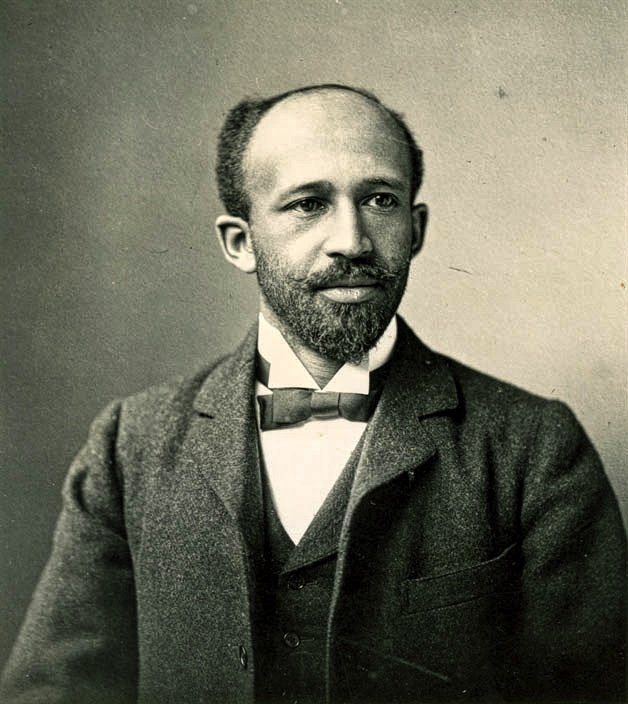
W. E. B. Du Bois, Black American sociologist, historian, philosopher and social leader.

Black American historian and sociologist W. E. B. Du Bois (1868–1963) was taught by William James. His contributions to pragmatist philosophy, like in other fields, worked toward the goal of equality for colored people. In The Souls of Black Folk (1903), he introduced the concept of double consciousness—the dual self-perception of Blacks, both through the lens of White society, and as they see themselves. In Darkwater: Voices from Within the Veil (1920), he introduced the concept of second sight—that this double consciousness provides a unique perspective from which to understand society. In Chicago in 1929, he memorably debated eugenicist and white supremacist Lothrop Stoddard (1883–1950), author of The Rising Tide of Color (1920).

==== C. I. Lewis ====
C. I. Lewis (1883–1964) was a Kantian who coined the term "qualia" and the founder of conceptual pragmatism. He pioneered modal logic and the strict conditional in response to the paradoxes of material implication. His work in modal logic was extended by Ruth Barcan Marcus (1921–2012).

=== Rejection of idealism ===
==== Santayana ====
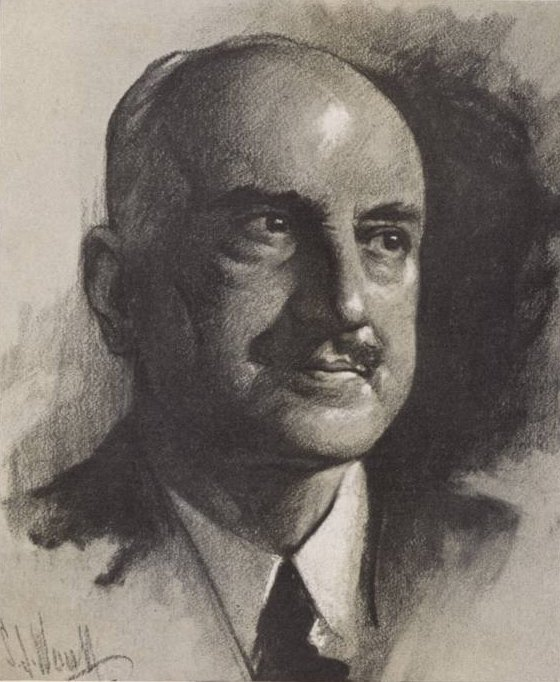
Spanish-American philosopher George Santayana.

Exceptions like Brand Blanshard (1892–1987) notwithstanding, idealism mostly fell out of favor in America, mirroring the British revolt against idealism. Spanish-American George Santayana (1863–1952) was a pragmatist and realist who thought idealism was a rejection of common sense and entailed skepticism. He criticized foundationalism, asserting that knowledge is not the result of reasoning, but what is required to act and successfully engage with the world, involving a sort of faith he termed "animal faith" in Scepticism and Animal Faith (1923). He was also a naturalist who believed scientists explain events in the natural world, while their meaning and value is studied by philosophers. Santayana contributed to aesthetics as well, writing The Sense of Beauty (1896).

==== New realism ====
Santayana was accompanied in the rejection of idealism by the New Realists, who criticized idealism as exhibiting the egocentric predicament. The New Realists were six American scholars, most notably Ralph Barton Perry (1878–1953), but also Edwin Bissell Holt, Walter Taylor Marvin, William Pepperell Montague, Walter Boughton Pitkin, and Edward Gleason Spaulding.

=== Analytic philosophy ===
The middle of the 20th century saw the dominance of analytic philosophy and the "linguistic turn" in America. Analytic philosophy began earlier in Europe with the work of Gottlob Frege, Bertrand Russell, G. E. Moore, Ludwig Wittgenstein, and the logical positivists of the Vienna Circle. According to logical positivism, the truths of logic and mathematics are analytic tautologies, and those of science are synthetic or empirically verifiable. Any other assertions, including those of metaphysics and most of philosophy, are meaningless.

One early advocate of analytic philosophy was Curt John Ducasse (1881–1969). With the rise of Adolf Hitler and the Nazi Party, many logical positivists fled Germany to Britain and America, and this helped reinforce the dominance of analytic philosophy. Philosophers who came to America include Gustav Bergmann, Rudolf Carnap, Herbert Feigl, Kurt Goedel, Hans Reichenbach, Philipp Frank, Richard von Mises, Carl Hempel, and Alfred Tarski. However, while heavily influenced by logical positivism, ensuing American philosophy would see its demise.

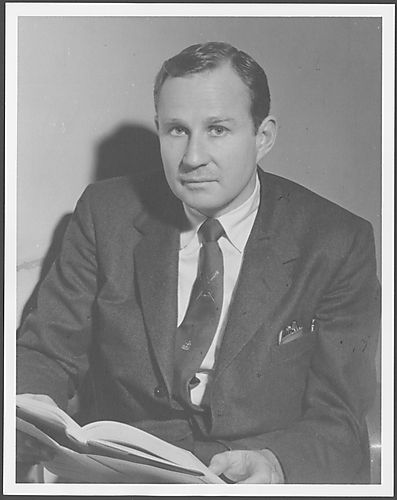
Wilfrid Sellars wished for a 'synoptic philosophy'.

Wittgenstein then had a radical shift and embraced a different philosophy of meaning as use, which influenced Oxford ordinary language philosophy. Morris Weitz (1916–1981) introduced America to the Oxford philosophy. Arthur Edward Murphy (1901–1962) was also influenced by the later Wittgenstein.

==== Sellars' critical realism ====
Santayana first aligned with proponents of critical realism—such as Roy Wood Sellars—who were also critics of idealism. Sellars later concluded Santayana and Charles Augustus Strong (1862–1940) were closer to New Realism in their emphasis on veridical perception, whereas Sellars, Arthur O. Lovejoy (1873–1962) and James Bissett Pratt (1875–1944) were more properly termed critical realists who emphasized "the distinction between intuition and denotative characterization". There was also the "perspective realism" of Evander Bradley McGilvary (1864–1953).

Critical realism was advanced by Sellars' son and Kant scholar Wilfrid Sellars (1912–1989), who "revolutionized both the content and the method of philosophy in the United States". Wilfrid Sellars criticism of the "Myth of the Given" in "Empiricism and the Philosophy of Mind" (1956) challenged logical positivism and sense-data theories. Sellars sought a synoptic philosophy uniting what he called the manifest and scientific images.

==== Quine's holism ====
Harvard philosopher W. V. O. Quine (1908–2000) was educated by Carnap, agreeing with logical positivism that philosophy should be like science, and sought to naturalize philosophy. However, Quine also criticized logical positivism, particularly the analytic/synthetic distinction in his essay "Two Dogmas of Empiricism" (1951), making him then the most famous American philosopher. Quine is also known for his dictum of ontological commitment presented in "On What There Is" (1948), "to be is to be the value of a variable". Quine coined the terms abstract object and Plato's beard.

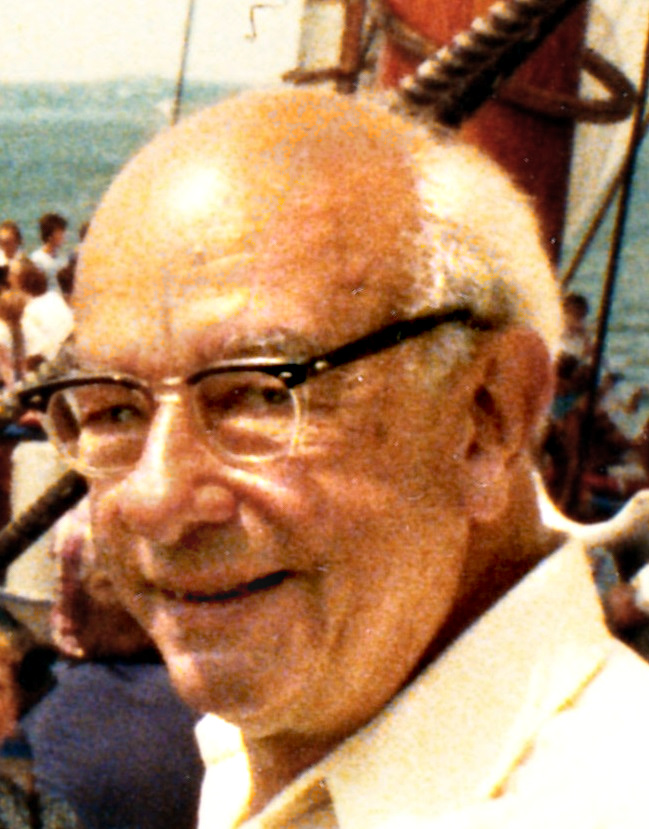
W. V. O. Quine in Halifax, NS harbor.

Quine advocated for a "web of belief," a kind of coherentist theory of justification. Quine doubted usual theories of meaning, and, instead of logical positivism, proposed a kind of semantic holism and ontological relativity, asserting that no experience occurs in isolation; every term in any statement has its meaning contingent on a vast network of knowledge and belief. This position in science has been dubbed the Duhem–Quine thesis, after Quine and Frenchman Pierre Duhem. Quine thought all beliefs are open to revision; some are just held stronger than others, and so hold come what may.

In his magnum opus Word and Object (1960), Quine illustrates the idea of radical translation, an introduction to his theory of the indeterminacy of translation, and specifically to prove the inscrutability of reference. A thought experiment describes a linguist curious what the expression gavagai means when uttered by a speaker of a yet-unknown native language upon seeing a rabbit. At first glance, it seems gavagai simply translates to rabbit. Quine points out there is no way to tell the speaker did not mean, for instance, "undetached rabbit-part" (such as its ear) or several other scenarios.

==== Kripke ====
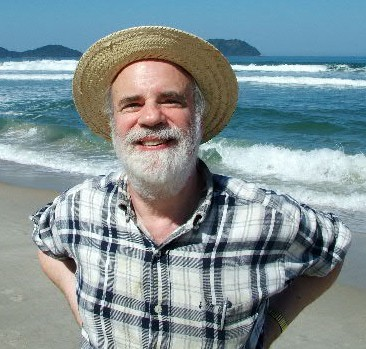
Saul Kripke at Juquehy Beach

Saul Kripke (1940–2022), a Quine student at Harvard, remarkably influenced analytic philosophy, and subsequently became the most famous American philosopher. (Note: Kripke was ranked among the top ten most important philosophers of the past 200 years in a poll conducted by Brian Leiter (Leiter Reports: a Philosophy Blog; open access poll)) Beginning while still a teenager, his contributions include Kripke semantics for modal and related logics. Kripke and Barcan both argued identity is a necessary relation. Kripke also has a notable theory of truth, and made important contributions to set theory (see admissible ordinal and Kripke–Platek set theory).

His 1970 Princeton lectures Naming and Necessity (1980), significantly restructured the philosophy of language, introducing the causal theory of reference for proper names and natural kind terms, in response to the prevailing view of descriptivism. Kripke revived theories of essence and identity and "made metaphysics respectable again". Kripke argued proper names are rigid designators, or designate the same thing in all possible worlds, unlike descriptions. For example, the description "winner of the 1968 US presidential election" might have designated Hubert Humphrey instead of Richard Nixon. However, the name "Richard Nixon" designates the man Richard Nixon, regardless of the election results.

Kant stated necessity is the criterion for a priori knowledge. Kripke argued necessity is a metaphysical notion distinct from the epistemic notion of a priori, and that there are necessary truths known a posteriori, such as that water is H_{2}O, or gold is atomic number 79.

Kripke also has a novel, skeptical interpretation of Wittgenstein, known as "Kripkenstein", expounded in Wittgenstein on Rules and Private Language (1982), which contains the rule-following argument.

==== Putnam ====
Quine and Kripke's colleague Hilary Putnam (1926–2016) argued that water is a natural kind with the Twin Earth thought experiment. Putnam is also known for the skeptical brain in a vat thought experiment, used to argue for semantic externalism.

==== David Lewis ====
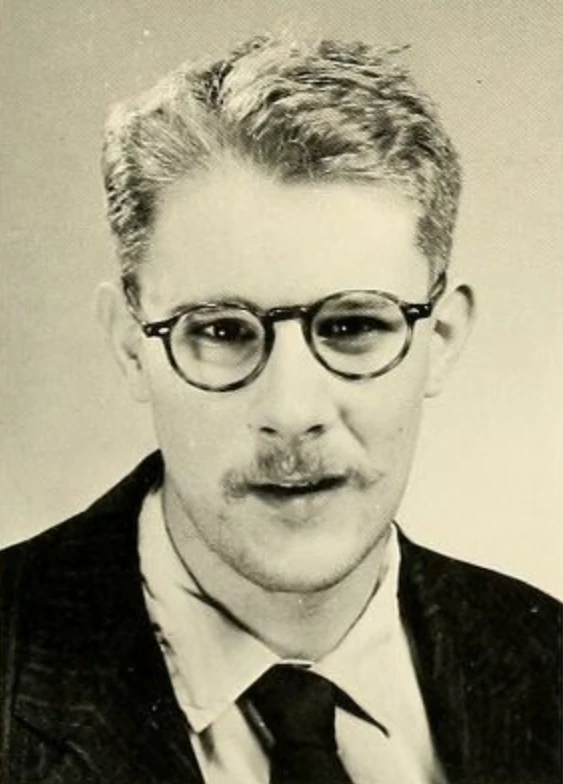
David Lewis believed in modal realism.

David Kellogg Lewis (1941–2001), another Quine student, is well known for his controversial advocacy of modal realism, which holds that there are an infinite number of concrete and causally isolated possible worlds, of which ours is one. (Note: Lewis was ranked as one of the greatest philosophers of the 20th century in a poll conducted by Brian Leiter (open access poll).) Lewis applied Quine's dictum of ontological commitment to the statement "There are other ways things could have been;" committing Lewis (by his lights) to the real existence of other ways things could have been. According to Lewis, "actual" is merely an indexical label we give a world when we are in it. In opposition to modal realism is modal actualism, defended by Kripke and Robert Stalnaker (b. 1940).

David Lewis also defended what he called Humean supervenience, and a counterfactual theory of causation, another Humean view. Lewis regularly visited Australia.

==== Gettier and epistemology ====
Owing largely to the Edmund Gettier (1927–2021) paper "Is Justified True Belief Knowledge?" (1963) and the so-called Gettier problem, epistemology has since enjoyed a resurgence as a topic of analytic philosophy. Using epistemic luck, Gettier provided counterexamples to the "justified true belief" (JTB) definition of knowledge, found as early as Plato's dialogue Theaetetus.

==== Kuhn and paradigm shifts ====
Thomas Kuhn (1922–1996) worked extensively in the history and philosophy of science. The Structure of Scientific Revolutions (1962), considered a milestone in the sociology of knowledge, argues that science proceeds through different paradigms as scientists find new puzzles to solve. After a widespread struggle to find answers to questions, a shift in outlook occurs, referred to by Kuhn as a paradigm shift.

=== Process philosophy ===
Process philosophy claims events and processes are the principal ontological categories, rather than substances, and embraces Albert Einstein's theory of relativity. Its proponents include Briton Alfred North Whitehead and Charles Hartshorne (1897–2000). Hartshorne developed process philosophy into process theology. Paul Weiss (1901–2002), founder of the Metaphysical Society of America, also defended process philosophy. Process philosophy and C. I. Lewis influenced Hegelian Otis Lee (1902–1948).

=== Political philosophy ===
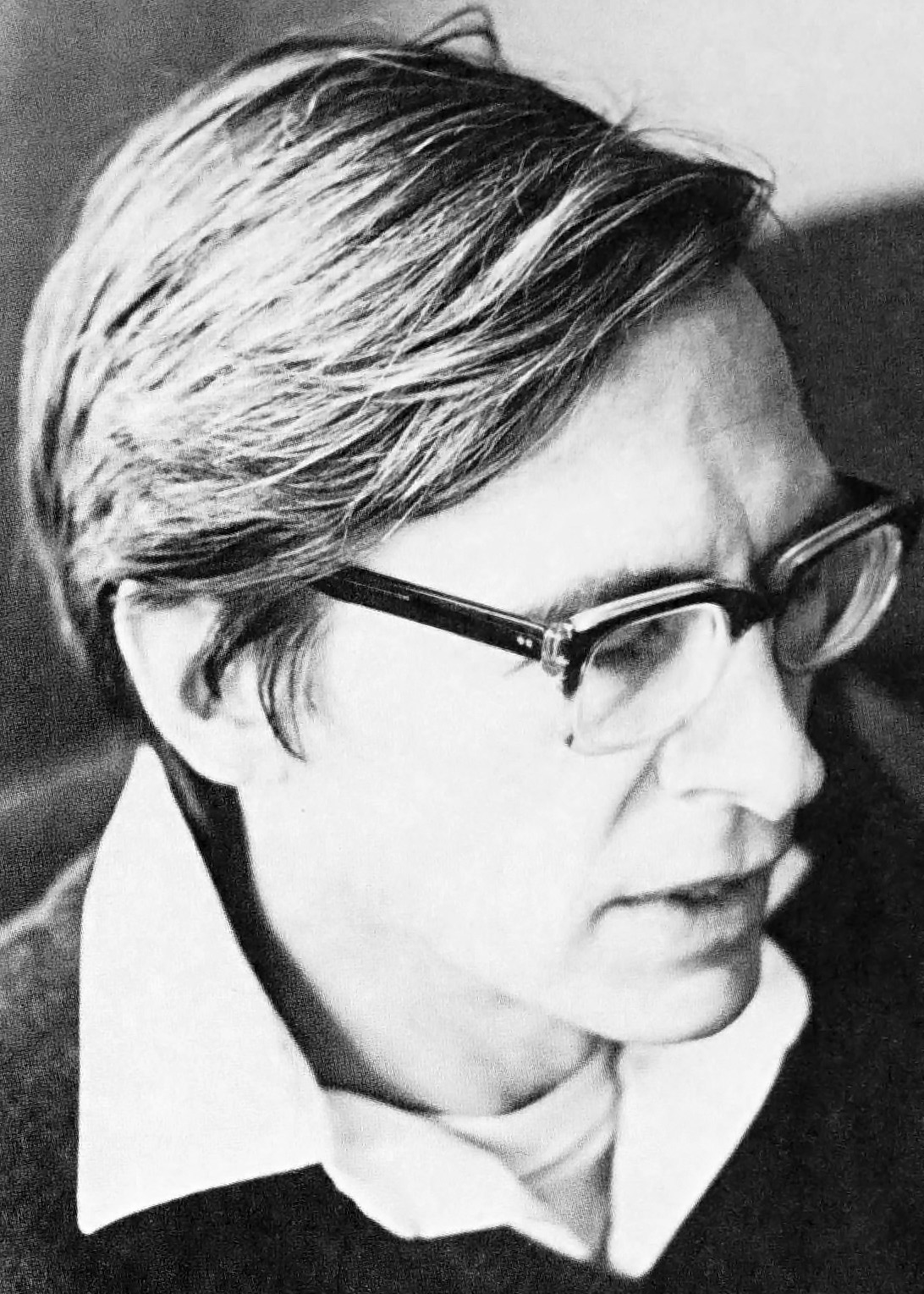
John Rawls

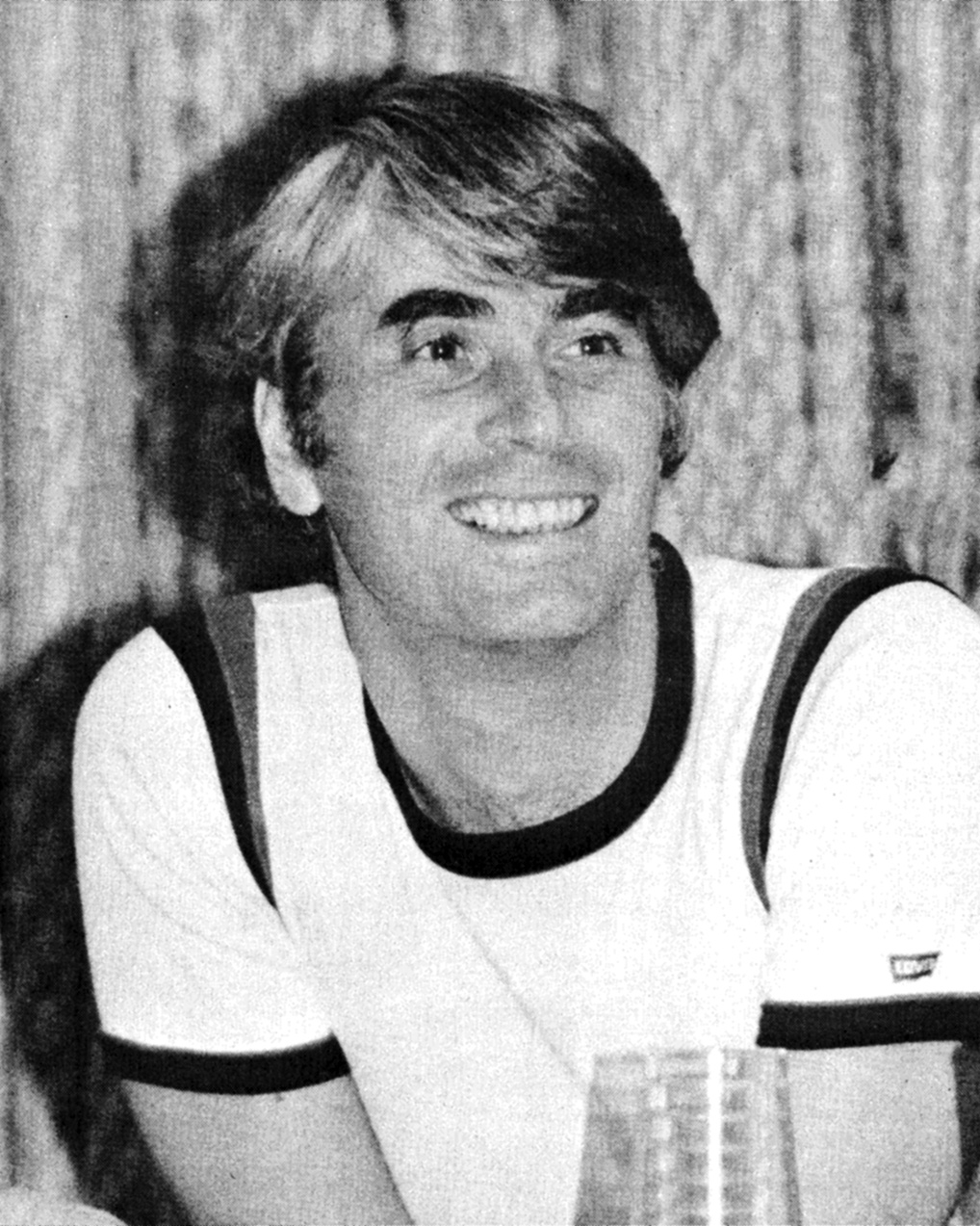
Robert Nozick

Carl Friedrich (1901–1984) founded the American Society for Political and Legal Philosophy in 1955.

==== Rawls ====
John Rawls (1921–2002) published A Theory of Justice (1971), which argues for justice as fairness, a version of social contract theory. Rawls employs the thought experiment of the veil of ignorance to illustrate the original position. While in the original position, which parallels the Hobbesian state of nature, people are said to be behind the veil of ignorance, which makes them unaware of their individual characteristics and place in society, such as their race, religion, or wealth, and able as rational persons to act justly. Rawls argues for a system of distributive justice in accordance with his difference principle, which says all social and economic inequalities must be to the greatest benefit of the least advantaged.

==== Nozick ====
Viewing Rawls as promoting excessive government control and rights violations, libertarian Robert Nozick (1938–2002) published Anarchy, State, and Utopia (1974), which advocates for a minimal state and defends individual liberty. Nozick argues government should be limited to "police protection, national defense, and the administration of courts of law, with all other tasks commonly performed by modern governments – education, social insurance, welfare, and so forth – taken over by religious bodies, charities, and other private institutions operating in a free market."

Nozick memorably criticizes Locke's labor theory of property:

[W]hy isn't mixing what I own with what I don't own a way of losing what I own rather than a way of gaining what I don't? If I own a can of tomato juice and spill it in the sea so that its molecules (made radioactive, so I can check this) mingle evenly throughout the sea, do I thereby come to own the sea, or have I foolishly dissipated my tomato juice?

Nozick defends the Wilt Chamberlain argument and entitlement theory of justice, which states if wealth is acquired in accordance with the principles of acquisition, transfer, and rectification, then any pattern of allocation is just, no matter how unequal the distribution.

==== Communitarianism ====
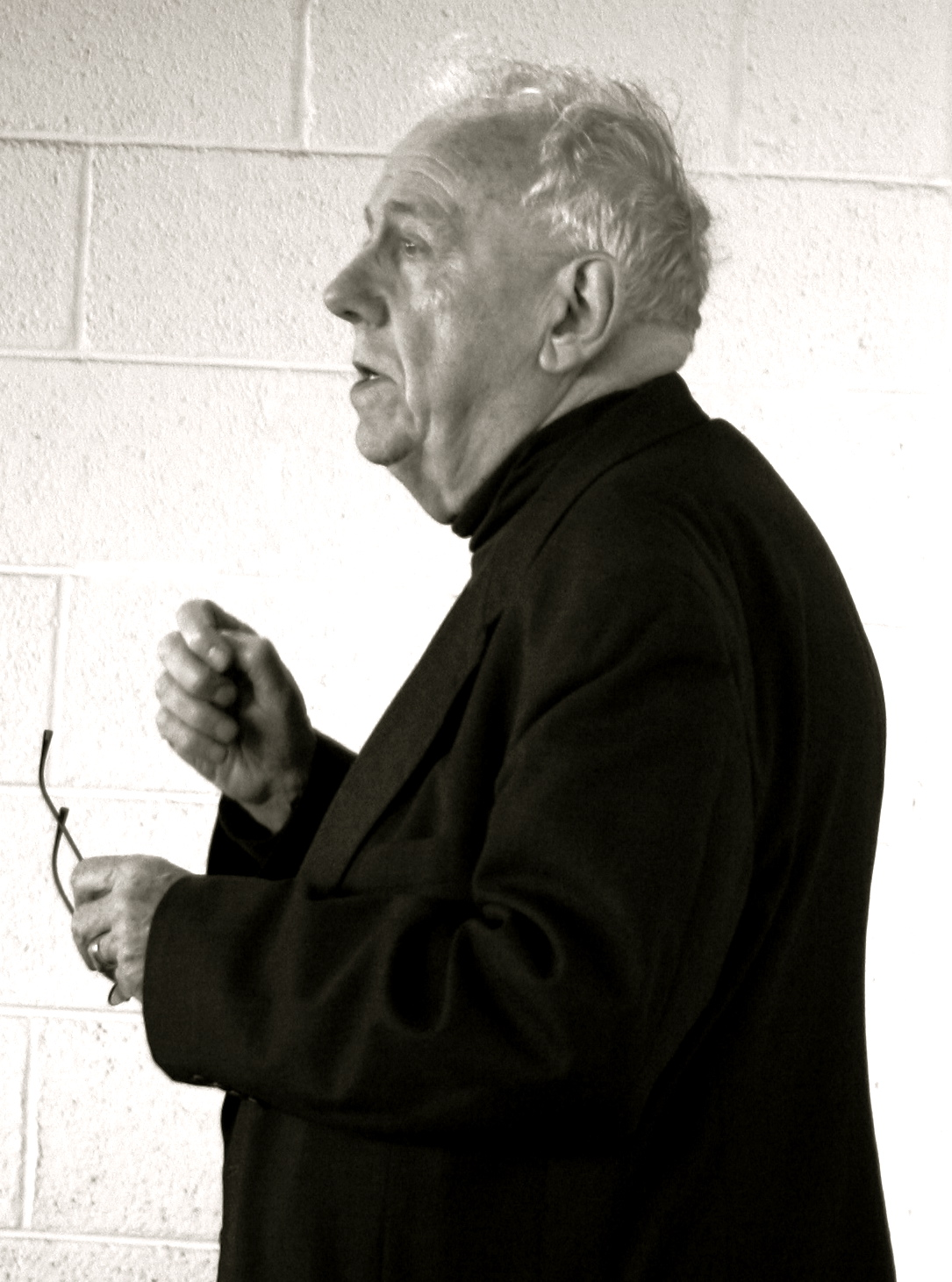
Alasdair MacIntyre advanced virtue ethics.

Alasdair MacIntyre (1929–2025) was a British Thomist who lived and worked in America. MacIntyre thought "modern philosophy and modern life are characterized by the absence of any coherent moral code, and that the vast majority of individuals living in this world lack a meaningful sense of purpose in their lives and also lack any genuine community". He recommended returning to genuine political communities where individuals can properly acquire their virtues. MacIntyre defends this "communitarianism" as an alternative to both Rawls and Nozick.

=== Ethics ===
G. E. Moore's view of non-naturalist moral realism is defended by Russ Shafer-Landau (b. 1963) in Moral Realism: A Defence (2003). Logical positivists advocated emotivism, as did Charles Stevenson (1908–1979).

Putnam questioned the fact-value distinction. Robert Nozick criticized utilitarianism with the utility monster. John Rawls and Thomas Nagel (b. 1937) revitalized academic interest in deontology. A notable student of Rawls' moral philosophy is animal rights advocate Christine Korsgaard (b. 1952).

==== Aristotelianism ====
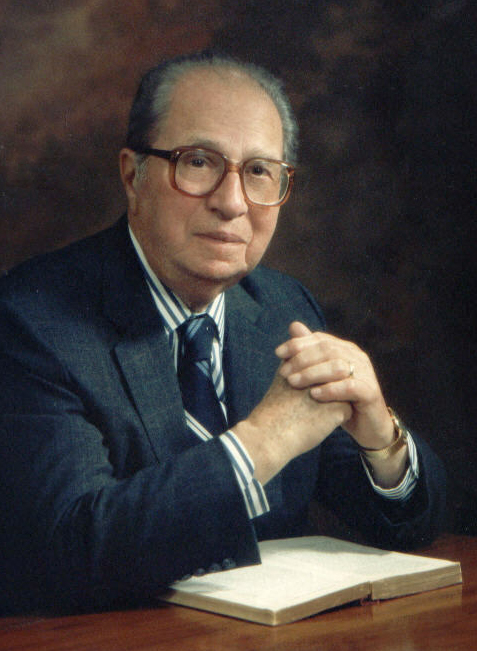
Mortimer Adler advocated Aristotelian philosophy

MacIntyre with After Virtue (1981) was partially responsible for the resurgence of interest in virtue ethics, a moral theory first propounded by the ancient Greek philosopher Aristotle. (Note: This has been dubbed the "aretaic turn".) As was Philippa Foot (1920–2010), who, while also a British philosopher, was the granddaughter of American president Grover Cleveland. Michael Slote (b. 1941) is a virtue ethicist.

Outside academic philosophy, University of Chicago president Maynard Hutchins reformed the curriculum according to recommendations by Aristotelian Mortimer Adler (1902–2001), who wrote Aristotle for Everybody (1978). Adler also influenced Sister Miriam Joseph to teach her college students the medieval Trivium of liberal arts. Adler served as chief editor of the Encyclopædia Britannica, and later founded the Aspen Institute to teach business executives. Richard McKeon (1900–1985) also taught Aristotle during the Hutchins era.

=== Civil rights ===
Also outside of academic philosophy, political and social concerns were a focus of the Civil Rights Movement and the speech and writings of Martin Luther King Jr. (1929–1968), a minister and activist known for advancing civil rights for people of color through nonviolence and civil disobedience.

=== Critical theory ===
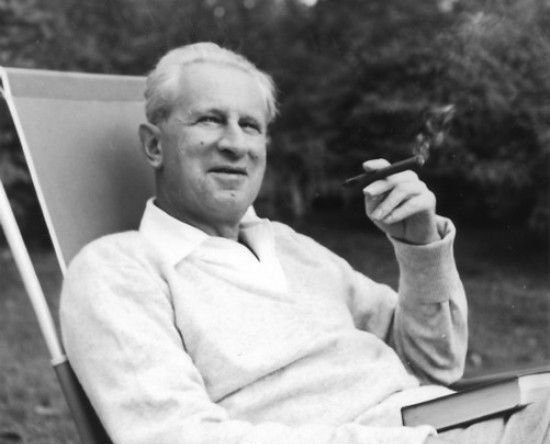
German-American critical theorist Herbert Marcuse, influential among the New Left.

Critical theory—specifically the social theory of the Frankfurt school—influenced philosophy and culture in America. Critical theory was rooted in continental, Western Marxism, whose proponents fled Nazi Germany. It sought philosophy that was "practical" and not merely "theoretical", helping not only to understand the world but to shape it—generally toward human emancipation and freedom from domination.

Critical theorist Herbert Marcuse, in Eros and Civilization (1955), responded to the pessimism of Sigmund Freud's Civilization and Its Discontents, by arguing for the emancipatory power of the imagination and for a "rationality of gratification", a fusion of Logos and Eros, for envisioning a better world. In One-Dimensional Man (1964), Marcuse argued for a "Great Refusal"—"the protest against that which is", in response to "un-freedoms" and oppressive, conformist social structures. Marcuse influenced Fredric Jameson (1934–2024).

Marcuse "was the most influential of the Frankfurt school critical theorists on North American intellectual culture" according to Doug Mann. According to Marcuse's student Angela Davis (b. 1944), Marcuse's principled utopianism articulated the ideals of a generation of activists and revolutionaries around the world. His thought influenced the New Left, notably the Black power movement and student movements of the 1960s. Putnam was an official faculty advisor to the Students for a Democratic Society, which opposed the Vietnam War and the draft.

Americans who engaged with critical theory outside of academic philosophy include Edward Said and bell hooks.

=== Feminism ===
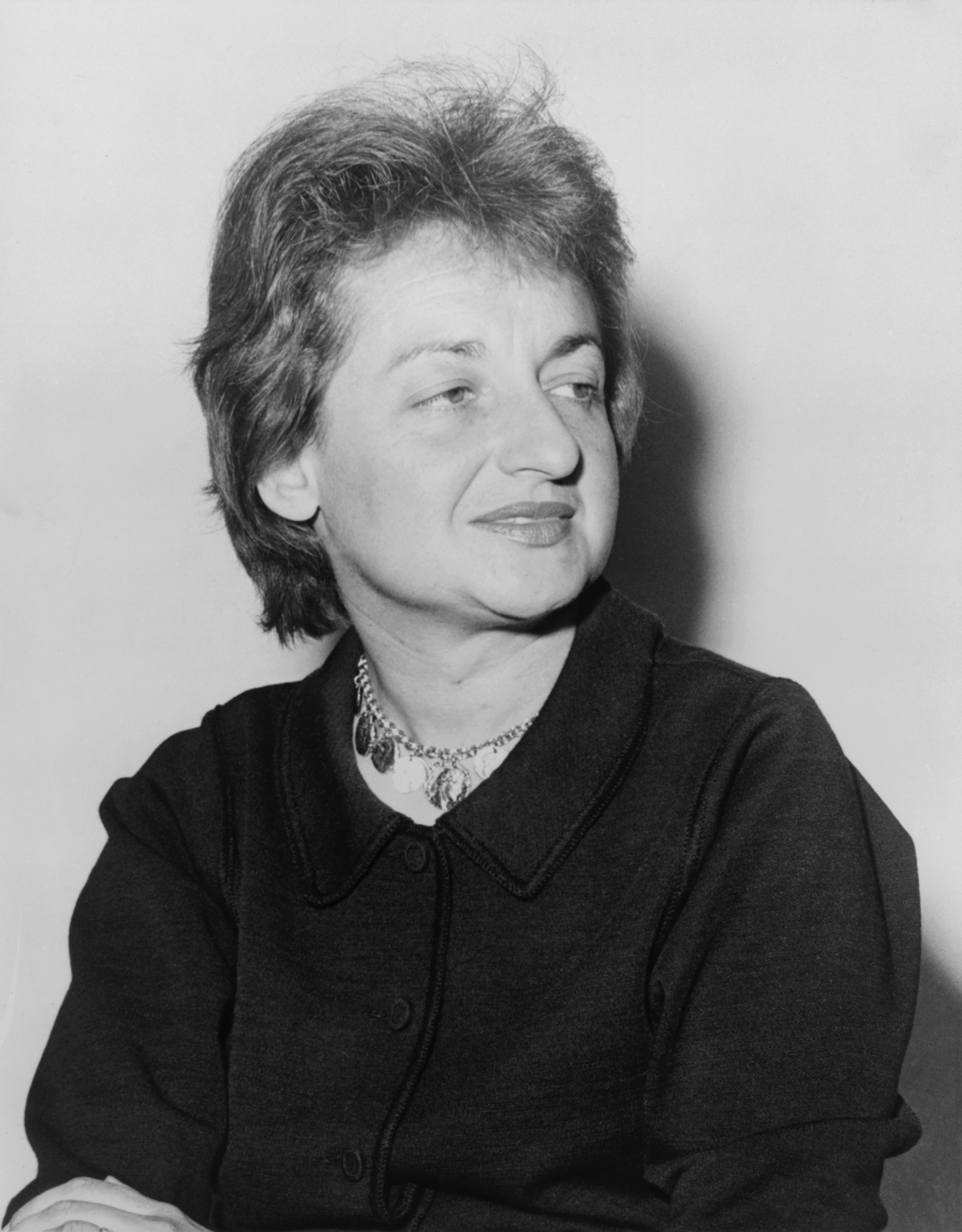
Betty Friedan

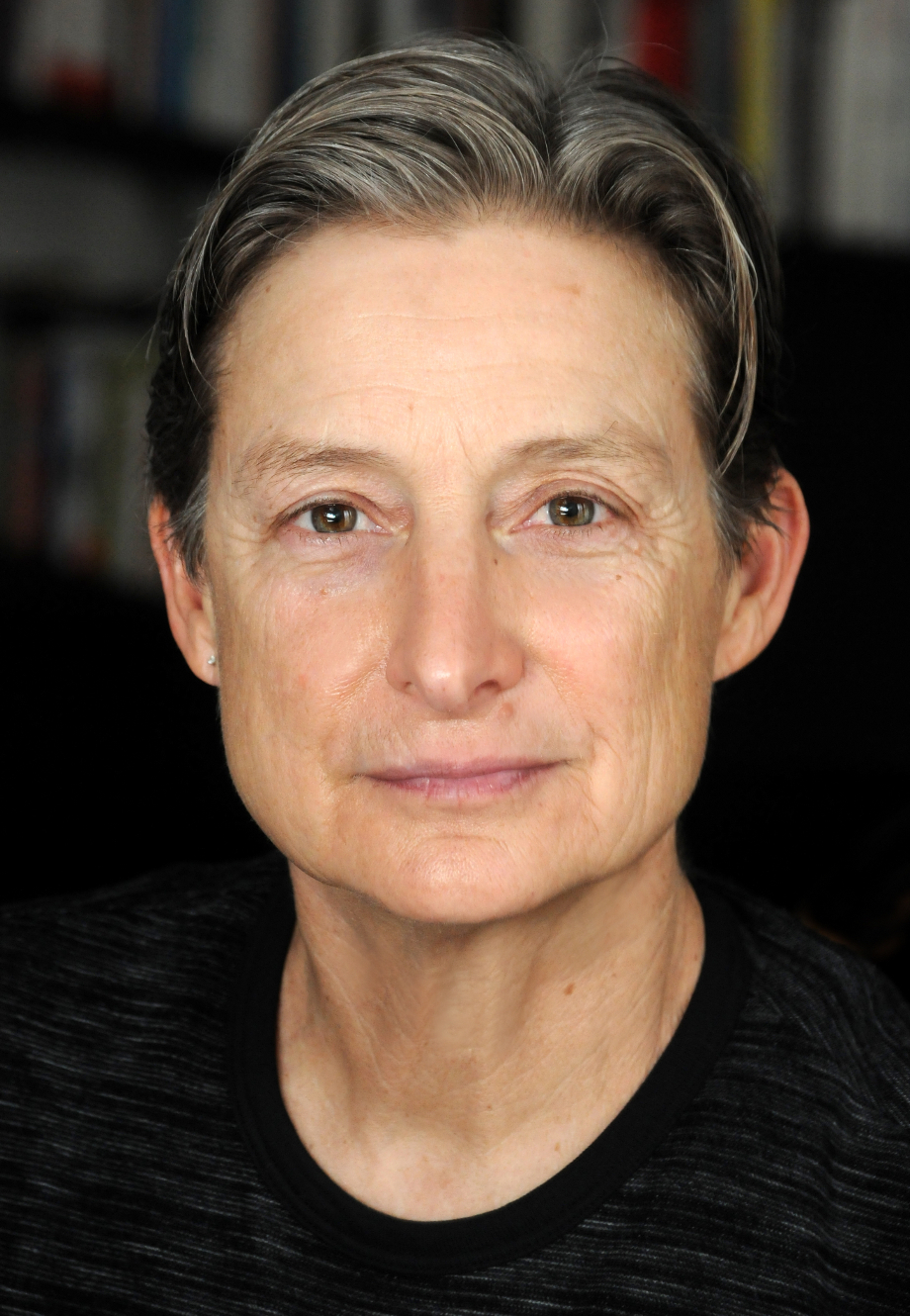
Judith Butler

While earlier Americans might be considered feminists, such as women's rights and women's suffrage advocates like Susan B. Anthony, Charlotte Perkins Gilman, Sarah Grimké, and Elizabeth Cady Stanton, second-wave feminism is notable for its impact on philosophy.

The catalyst for American second-wave feminism was Betty Friedan's (1921–2006) The Feminine Mystique (1963). This was accompanied by others such as Alicia Ostriker and Adrienne Rich, who critiqued assumptions and values like objectivity, maintaining there is no such thing as a value-neutral inquiry. They also criticized what they saw as masculine approaches to ethics and politics, such as rights-based theories, and sought to analyze the social dimensions of philosophy.

Judith Butler (b. 1956) was influenced by critical theory and wrote Gender Trouble (1990), which argued for an understanding of gender as socially constructed and performative, helping to establish gender studies. Butler is associated with third wave feminism and queer theory.

=== Objectivism ===
Ayn Rand (1905–1982) penned the novels The Fountainhead (1943) and Atlas Shrugged (1957) and remains a popular figure within American culture. These novels birthed the Objectivist movement and influenced students, including a young Alan Greenspan, a libertarian who became Chairman of the Federal Reserve. Objectivism advocates an objective external reality known by reason, ethical egoism, and laissez-faire capitalism. Several academic philosophers are highly critical of the quality and intellectual rigor of Rand's work, preferring it be labeled pseudo-philosophy.

== Contemporary American analytic philosophy ==
=== Neopragmatism ===
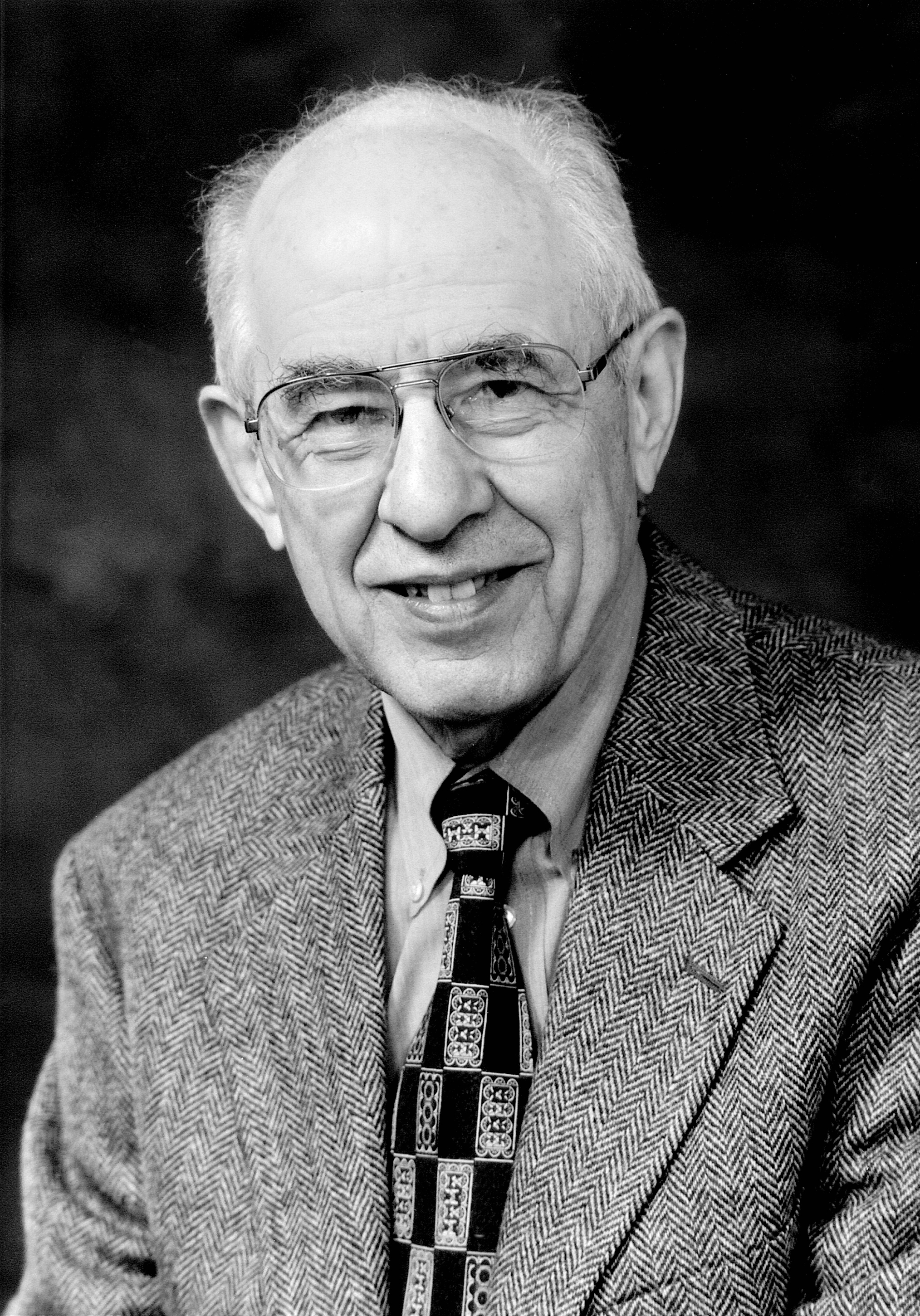
Hilary Putnam is considered a neopragmatist.

The end of the 20th century saw a resurgence of interest in pragmatism, known as neopragmatism. Largely responsible for this are Putnam and Richard Rorty (1931–2007), author of Philosophy and the Mirror of Nature (1979) and Philosophy and Social Hope (1999).

Rorty influenced neopragmatists like black activist and critical theorist Cornel West (b. 1953). Other neopragmatists like Susan Haack (1945–2026) are highly critical of Rorty. Morton White (1917–2016) was a proponent of holistic pragmatism. Nicholas Rescher (1928–2024) proposed methodological pragmatism and pragmatic idealism.

Other American scholars have renewed an interest in Dewey's ethics, exploring the moral imperatives justifying an adherence to pacifism and nonviolence. Specific attention is given to the limitations and contradictions in traditional just war theories when applied to modern forms of warfare, such as nuclear war and modern deterrence theory. Noteworthy in this group are Robert L. Holmes, Duane Cady, and Barry L. Gan.

=== Pittsburgh school ===
Influenced by Wilfrid Sellars, Rescher includes himself and his University of Pittsburgh colleagues John McDowell (b. 1942) and Robert Brandom (b. 1950) in a group of post-Hegelian "neo-idealists" known as the Pittsburgh school. (Note: Several mid-20th century American analytic philosophers renewed the study of idealism, such as the works of Kant, by establishing close research relationships between leading scholars in Germany and their American counterparts. They resolved several of the linguistic ambiguities within Kant's work, such as the exposition of the analytic-synthetic distinction and the synthetic a priori. The efforts of Lewis White Beck were particularly noteworthy.) In Mind and World (1994), McDowell embraced an intricate form of "mitigated naturalism" derived from Kant's distinction between spontaneity and receptivity, while also circumventing the two extremes of "rampant Platonism" and "bald naturalism".

=== Epistemology ===
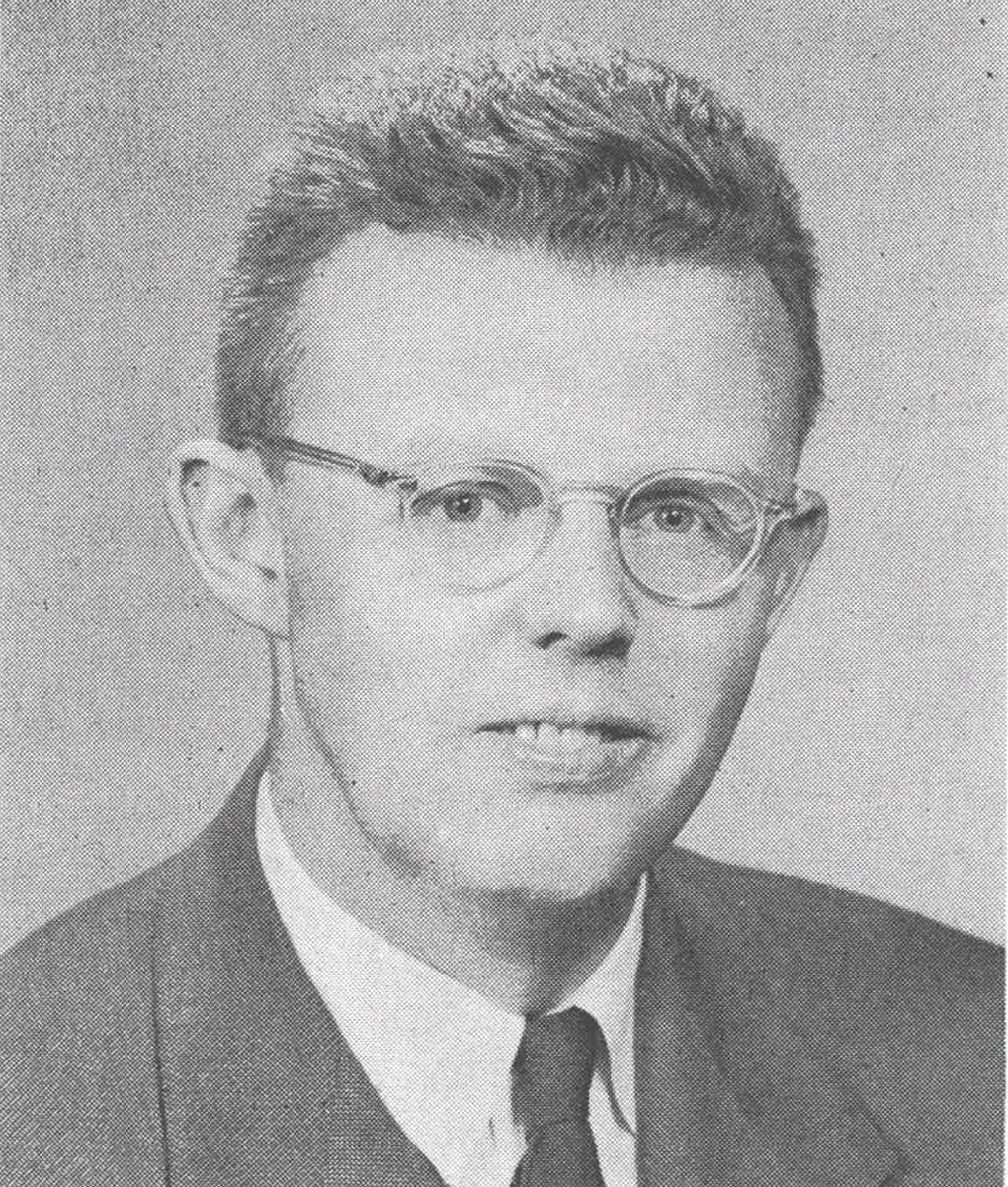
Roderick Chisholm contributed to epistemology.

Nelson Goodman (1906–1998) expanded on Hume's problem of induction and developed the new riddle of induction in Fact, Fiction, and Forecast (1955). Roderick Chisholm (1916–1999) studied under C. I. Lewis, but rejected Kantianism for direct realism. He is best known for the problem of the criterion in Theory of Knowledge (1966).

Responding to Moore's "here is one hand", Nozick and Fred Dretske (1932–2013) defended a truth-tracking theory of knowledge and denied epistemic closure. Norman Malcolm (1911–1990) was a notable American epistemologist critical of Moore.

Ernest Sosa (b. 1940) proposed virtue epistemology in "The Raft and the Pyramid" (1980). Michael Huemer (b. 1969) defends phenomenal conservatism. Alvin Goldman (1938–2024) developed a causal theory in "A Causal Theory of Knowing" (1967). Susan Haack defends foundherentism. Barry Stroud (1935–2019) advanced, and criticized, transcendental arguments against skepticism.

There is a debate between internalists like Huemer, and externalists like Goldman, who advanced reliabilism. Most externalists reject the KK thesis, which has been disputed since the introduction of epistemic logic by Jaakko Hintikka (1929–2015) in 1962.

=== Philosophy of mind ===
Philosophy of mind is popular in America and discusses the hard problem of consciousness, so called by Australian David Chalmers. Motivated by logical positivism, many philosophers were behaviorists. (Note: Herbert Feigl published a summary of the early debates, "The 'Mental' and the 'Physical'", in 1958 (with a postscript in 1967).) The criticisms of type identity theory led to Donald Davidson's theory of anomalous monism. The dominant theory is functionalism, first associated with Wilfrid Sellars, and defended by Putnam, Jerry Fodor, William Lycan, and Sydney Shoemaker.

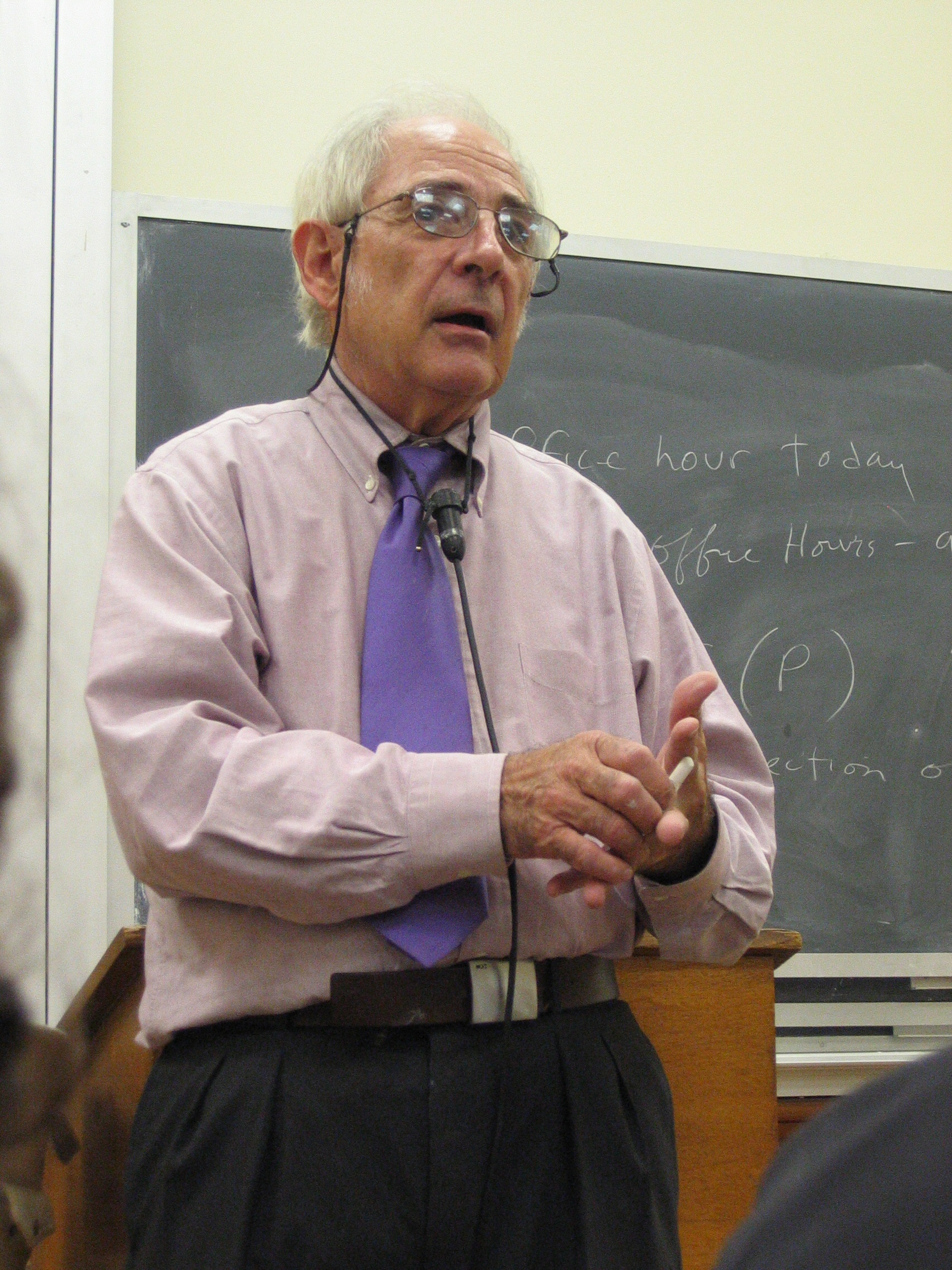
John Searle contributed to philosophy of mind and language.

John Searle (1932–2025) advocated emergent materialism and is notable for his Chinese Room argument against strong AI. Ned Block (b. 1942) similarly evoked the China brain. Douglas Hofstadter (b. 1945) also believes the mind is emergent in Gödel, Escher, Bach (1979), from self-referential "strange loops".

Patricia (b. 1943) and Paul Churchland (b. 1942) argue for eliminative materialism. Daniel Dennett (1942–2024) in works like Consciousness Explained (1991) is generally considered an eliminativist about qualia and phenomenal aspects of consciousness (but not about intentionality). Dennett coined terms like intuition pump.

Thomas Nagel is notable for his anti-physicalist views in What is it like to be a bat? (1974). Nagel asserts that "an organism has conscious mental states if and only if there is something that it is like to be that organism—something it is like for the organism." This assertion has achieved special status in consciousness studies with "the standard 'what it's like' locution".

In the early 21st century, embodied cognition gained strength as a theory of mind–body–world integration. Philosophers such as Shaun Gallagher (b. 1948) and Alva Noë (b. 1964) defend this view and see it as a natural development of pragmatism and Kant, Heidegger and Merleau-Ponty, among others.

=== Philosophy of language ===
Nathan Salmon (b. 1951) and Scott Soames (b. 1945) focus on philosophy of language. The theories of linguist Noam Chomsky (b. 1928) are influential, such as deep structure. Terence Parsons (1939–2022) defended Meinongianism in Nonexistent Objects (1980). Searle defended descriptivism with cluster theory. Keith Donnellan (1931–2015) was critical of descriptivism.

Donald Davidson (1917–2003) is perhaps best known for his thought experiment of Swampman, which argues for semantic externalism, and for his development of truth-conditional semantics. Tyler Burge (b. 1946) similarly argues for externalism with the example of "arthritis in the knee".

George Philip Lakoff (b. 1941) and Mark L. Johnson (b. 1949) presented insights in cognitive linguistics by exploring how conceptual metaphors influence the process of understanding and the conveyance of "meaning" in general. Max Black (1909–1988) had an interaction theory of metaphor.

=== Philosophy of mathematics ===
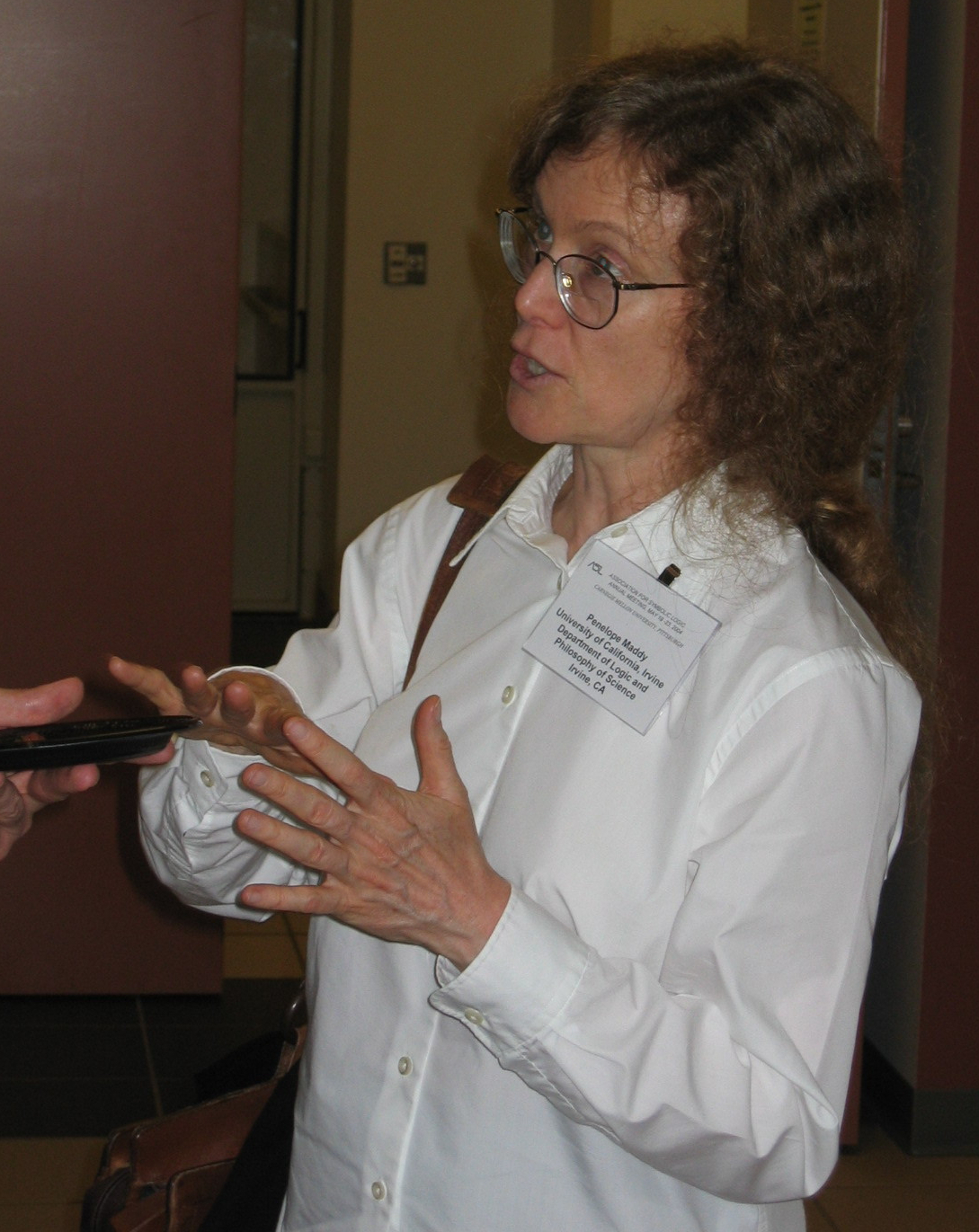
Penelope Maddy is an influential philosopher of mathematics

Eugene Wigner (1902–1995) wrote The Unreasonable Effectiveness of Mathematics in the Natural Sciences (1959). Quine and Putnam argued for platonism with the indispensability argument. Putnam also defended quasi-empiricism. Penelope Maddy (b. 1950) defends realism. Edward Zalta (b. 1952) defends abstract object theory, and runs the Stanford Encyclopedia of Philosophy. Joel David Hamkins (b. 1966) focuses on philosophy of mathematics.

Paul Benacerraf (1930–2025) has an influential argument against mathematical platonism. Hartry Field (b. 1946) argued for mathematical fictionalism in Science Without Numbers (1980).

=== Philosophy of science ===
Colin Murray Turbayne (1916–2006) showed ancient dead metaphors continue to influence the philosophy of science. Tim Maudlin (b. 1958) advances the philosophy of physics. Terrence L. Fine (1939–2021) wrote on probability. Dennett defends Neo-Darwinism and natural selection in Darwin's Dangerous Idea (1995), while Jerry Fodor (1935–2017) criticizes natural selection in What Darwin Got Wrong (2010).

Putnam defended scientific realism. Bas van Fraassen (b. 1941) argued for scientific anti-realism. The Stanford school including Nancy Cartwright, Peter Galison, and Patrick Suppes proposes entity realism and argued against the unity of science.

=== Philosophy of time ===
Philosophy of time is influenced by Briton John McTaggart's The Unreality of Time (1908), which distinguishes between the dynamic or tensed A-theory of time (past, present, future), in which time flows; and the static or tenseless B-theory of time (earlier than, simultaneous with, later than). William Lane Craig (b. 1949) defends the A-theory; Nathan Oaklander defends the B-theory.

=== Christian philosophy ===
==== Reformed epistemology ====
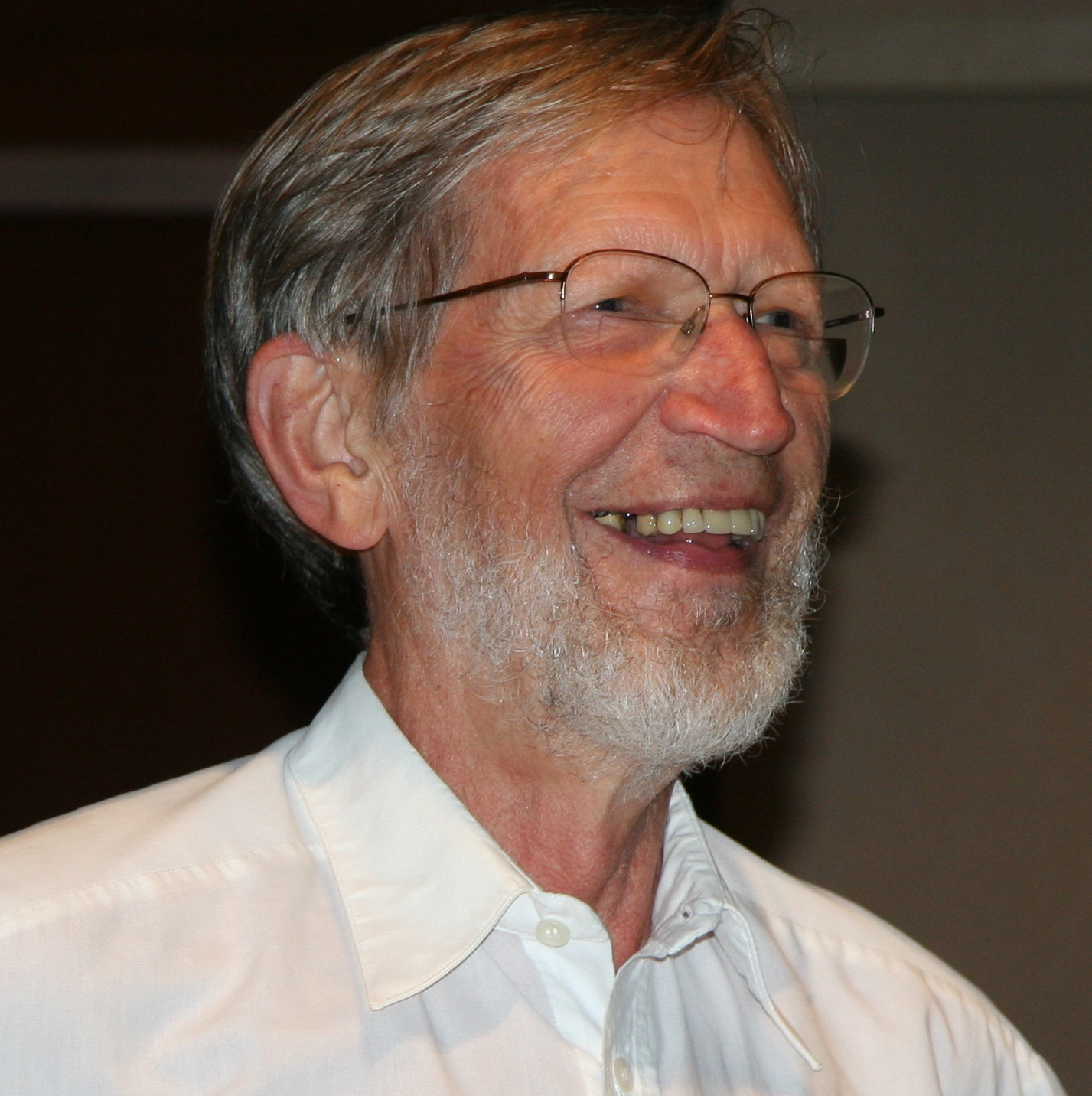
Alvin Plantinga is a prominent Christian philosopher.

Alvin Plantinga (b. 1932) was once described by Time magazine as "America's leading orthodox Protestant philosopher of God". He revitalized interest in Christian philosophy and reformed epistemology with God and Other Minds (1967), which argues that belief in the existence of God is properly basic. The Nature of Necessity (1974) contains his modal version of the ontological argument. The Evangelical Philosophical Society was founded in 1974, and the Society of Christian Philosophers was founded in 1978.

Plantinga is further known for his free will defense to the logical problem of evil. He also has an epistemological trilogy, Warrant: The Current Debate (1993), Warrant and Proper Function (1993), and Warranted Christian Belief (2000). They contain the evolutionary argument against naturalism. (Note: Michael C. Rea has developed Plantinga's thought by claiming that both naturalism and supernaturalism are research programmes that have to be adopted as a basis for research.)

American Christian philosophy includes Peter van Inwagen, Norman Geisler, William Lane Craig, William Alston, and Nicholas Wolterstorff. Peter Van Inwagen (b. 1942) is a Christian materialist notable for doubting the principle of sufficient reason. Van Inwagen also believes in free will and advances the consequence argument, introducing the term incompatibilism about free will and determinism, to stand in contrast to compatibilism—the view that free will is compatible with determinism. William Alston (1921–2009) and Robert Merrihew Adams (1937–2024) defended divine command theory. William Lane Craig defends the Kalam cosmological argument in the book (1979) of the same name.

Jc Beall (b. 1966) advocates glut theory, logical pluralism, and Christianity, writing Spandrels of Truth (2009) and The Contradictory Christ (2021).

==== Catholicism ====
Edward A. Pace (1861–1938) started the American Catholic Philosophical Association in 1926. As well as MacIntyre, Eleonore Stump (b. 1947) is a Thomist interested in the free will defense.

==== Atheism ====
Paul Edwards (1923–2004) criticized Heidegger, religion, and reincarnation, and published The Encyclopedia of Philosophy (1967). Atheist Paul Draper (b. 1957) coined skeptical theism.

=== Law ===
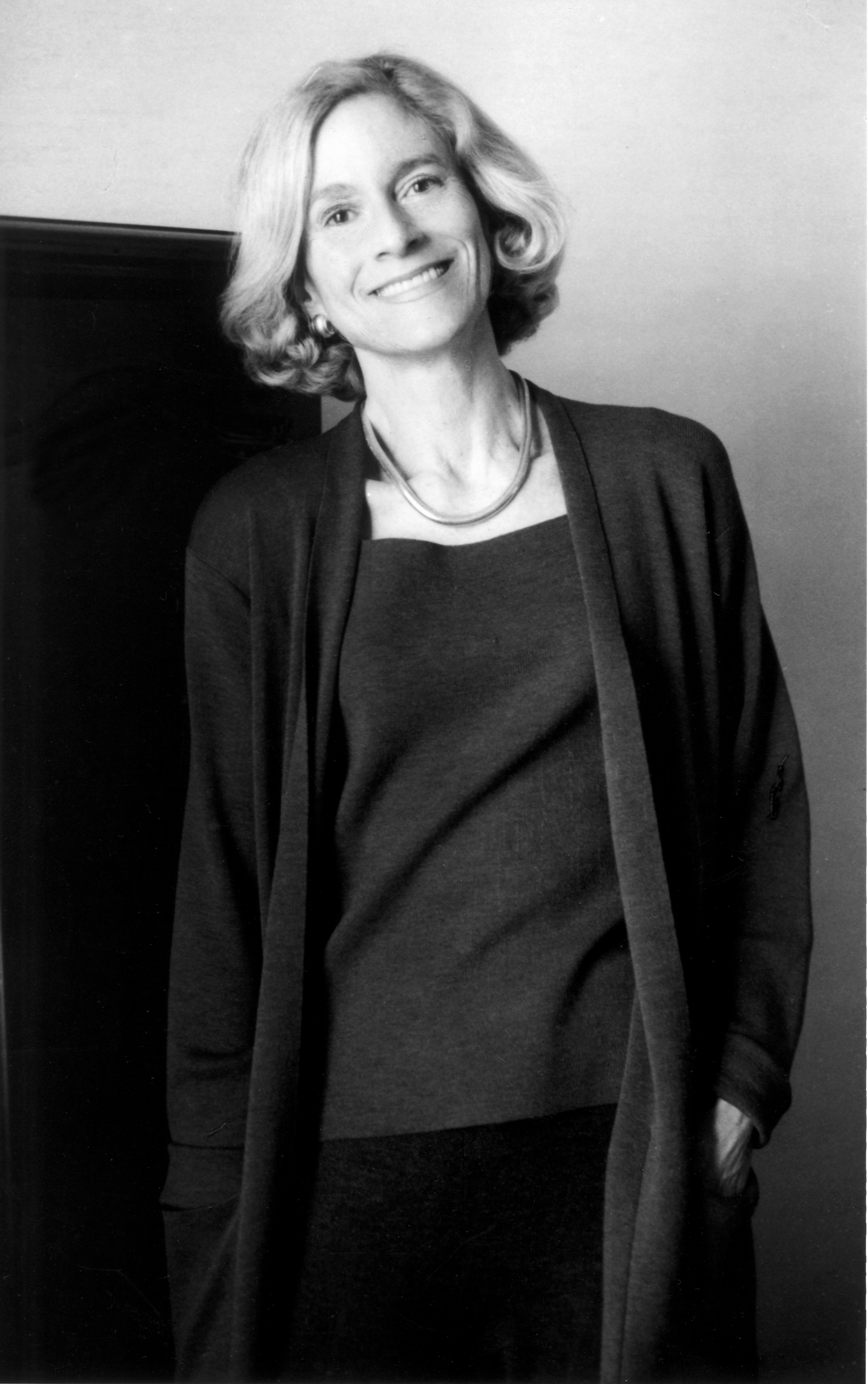
Martha Nussbaum is known for her work in ethics, political philosophy, and the philosophy of emotions.

Noted American legal philosophers Ronald Dworkin (1931–2013) and Richard Posner (b. 1939) wrote on politics and jurisprudence. Posner's economic analysis of law uses microeconomics to understand legal rules and institutions. Dworkin is prominent for his theory of law as integrity and legal interpretivism, presented in his book Law's Empire (1986). Joel Feinberg (1926–2004) also wrote on law. Robert Paul Wolff (1933–2025) was an anarchist, penning In Defense of Anarchism (1970).

=== Aesthetics ===
Van Meter Ames (1898–1985) started the American Society for Aesthetics in 1942. Susanne Langer (1895–1985) wrote a theory of symbolism in Philosophy in a New Key (1942). Morris Weitz argued that necessary and sufficient conditions will never exist for the concept 'art' because it is an "open concept". Arthur Danto (1924–2013) and George Dickie (1926–2020) argued for the artworld or an "institutional definition of art". Dickie's student was Noël Carroll (b. 1947), who contributes to philosophy of film. There is also the historical definition, best exemplified by Jerrold Levinson (b. 1948). Kendall Walton (b. 1939) formulated a "make-believe" theory of representation influencing the fields of anti-realist ontology and aesthetics.

=== Wisdom ===
A renewed interest in the ancient concept of wisdom emerged among several American philosophers. Emphasizing compassion, empathy and understanding, these scholars argued that rational thought by itself is necessary, but not sufficient for philosophy. Included in this group are critical theory influenced Martha Nussbaum (b. 1947) and Richard Clyde Taylor (1919–2003).

=== Quietism ===
Cora Diamond (b. 1937) attended Swansea University, where Wittgenstein student Rush Rhees had taught. Diamond and McDowell along with James F. Conant (b. 1958) and Alice Crary (b. 1967) lead a quietist interpretation of Wittgenstein.

== See also ==
- History of philosophy

=== Lists ===
- List of Jewish American philosophers

=== Organizations ===
- American Association of Philosophy Teachers

== Sources ==
- Ayer, A. J., ed. (1959). "Editor's introduction". Logical Positivism. Free Press. pp. 3–30.
- Gettier, Edmund L. (1963). "Is Justified True Belief Knowledge?". Analysis. 23 (6): 121–123. doi:10.1093/analys/23.6.121.
- Plato (1992). Burnyeat, Myles (ed.). Theaetetus. Hackett.
- Searle, John (2003). "Contemporary Philosophy in the United States". In Bunnin, N.; Tsui-James, E. P (eds.). The Blackwell Companion to Philosophy. Blackwell.
- Soames, Scott (2003). Philosophical Analysis in the Twentieth Century: Volume 1, The Dawn of Analysis. Princeton University Press.
