= 1870 in literature =

This article contains information about the literary events and publications of 1870.

== Events ==
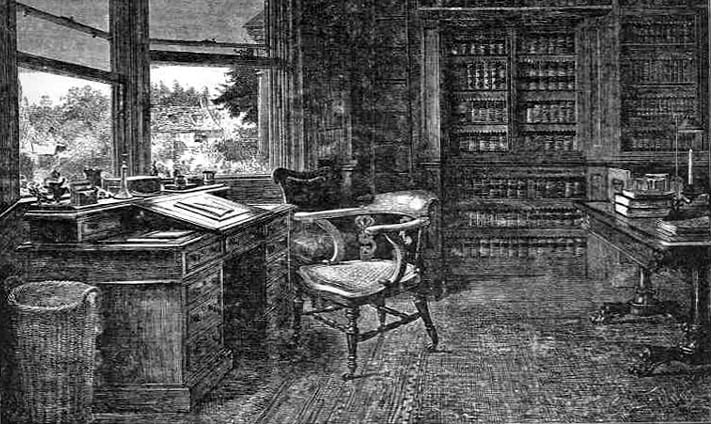
Luke Fildes – The Empty Chair (engraving). Fildes, the illustrator for Edwin Drood at the time of Charles Dickens's death, shows Dickens's empty chair in his study at Gads Hill Place. It appears in the Christmas edition of The Graphic and thousands of prints of it are sold.

- January 19 – Ivan Turgenev attends and writes about the public execution by guillotine of the spree killer Jean-Baptiste Troppmann outside the gates of La Roquette Prisons in Paris.
- March 7 – Thomas Hardy meets his first wife, Emma Gifford, in Cornwall.
- March 28 – Serialisation of Kenward Philp's The Bowery Detective in The Fireside Companion (New York) begins, the first known story to include the word detective in the title.
- April–September – The serialisation of Charles Dickens' last novel, The Mystery of Edwin Drood, is left unfinished on his death on June 9 at Gads Hill Place in Kent, from a stroke, aged 58.
- May – Karl May begins a second four-year prison sentence for thefts and frauds, at Waldheim, Saxony.
- Spring – Serial publication begins of Aleksis Kivi's only novel Seitsemän veljestä ("Seven Brothers"), the first notable novel in the Finnish language.
- August 24/25 – Libraries of the University of Strasbourg and the City of Strasbourg at Temple Neuf are destroyed by fire during the Siege of Strasbourg in the Franco-Prussian War, resulting in the loss of 3,446 medieval manuscripts, including the original 12th-century Hortus deliciarum compiled by Herrad of Landsberg, the Apologist codex containing the only text of the early Epistle to Diognetus, and rare Renaissance books.
- September 17 – The first performance of Alexander Pushkin's play Boris Godunov (1825) is given at the Mariinsky Theatre in Saint Petersburg by members of the Alexandrinsky Theatre.
- c. September 20 – Friedrich Engels moves permanently to London from Manchester.
- December 18 – The Russian literary weekly Niva («Ни́ва», "Cornfield") is first published by Adolf Marks in Saint Petersburg.
- unknown date – Construction of the David Sassoon Library in Bombay, India, is completed.

== New books ==
=== Fiction ===
- William Harrison Ainsworth - Talbot Harland
- Thomas Bailey Aldrich – The Story of a Bad Boy
- Thomas Archer – The Terrible Sights of London
- Rhoda Broughton – Red as a Rose is She
- Wilkie Collins – Man and Wife
- Annie Denton Cridge - Man's Rights; Or, How Would You Like It? Comprising Dreams
- José Maria de Eça de Queiroz and Ramalho Ortigão – O Mistério da Estrada de Sintra (The Mystery of the Sintra Road)
- Charles Dickens – The Mystery of Edwin Drood
- Benjamin Disraeli – Lothair
- Fyodor Dostoevsky – The Eternal Husband («Вечный муж», Vechny muzh)
- Edward Jenkins – Ginx's Baby: his birth and other misfortunes
- Mór Jókai – Fekete gyémántok (Black Diamonds, i. e. coal)
- Aleksis Kivi – Seitsemän veljestä (Seven Brothers)
- Jonas Lie – Den Fremsynte (The Visionary or Pictures From Nordland)
- George Meredith – The Adventures of Harry Richmond (begins serial publication)
- William Morris – The Earthly Paradise
- Charles Reade - Put Yourself in His Place
- Leopold von Sacher-Masoch – Venus in Furs (Venus im Pelz)
- Mikhail Saltykov-Shchedrin – The History of a Town («История одного города», Istoriya odnogo goroda)
- Bayard Taylor – Joseph and His Friend: A Story of Pennsylvania
- Anthony Trollope – The Vicar of Bullhampton
- Ivan Turgenev – Stepnoy korol Lir (Степной король Лир); novella, English translation: King Lear of the Steppes'
- Jules Verne – Twenty Thousand Leagues Under the Seas
- Charlotte M. Yonge – The Caged Lion

=== Children and young people ===
- John Neal — Great Mysteries and Little Plagues

=== Drama ===
- James Albery – Two Roses
- Ludwig Anzengruber (as L. Gruber) – Der Pfarrer von Kirchfeld (The Priest of Kirchfeld)
- Henry James Byron – Uncle Dick's Darling
- Pietro Cossa – Nero
- Lydia Koidula
  - Maret ja Miina (or Kosjakased; The Betrothal Birches)
  - Saaremaa Onupoeg (The Cousin from Saaremaa)
- Lord Newry – Ecarte
- George Sand and Sarah Bernhardt – L'Autre
- Aleksey Konstantinovich Tolstoy – Tsar Boris («Царь Борис», published)

=== Poetry ===
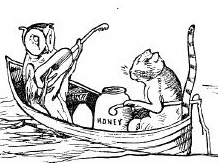
Lear's illustration of The Owl and the Pussycat from Nonsense Songs

- Bret Harte – The Heathen Chinee
- Edward Lear – Nonsense Songs, Stories, Botany, and Alphabets (dated 1871), including "The Owl and the Pussycat"
- Giovanni Marradi – Canzone moderne
- Dante Gabriel Rossetti – Poems, including "Jenny" and a fragment of "The House of Life"

=== Non-fiction ===
- J. E. Austen-Leigh – A Memoir of Jane Austen
- Brewer's Dictionary of Phrase and Fable (1st edition)
- Richard William Church – Life of St. Anselm
- Thomas Wentworth Higginson - Army Life in a Black Regiment
- Hargrave Jennings – The Rosicrucians, their Rites and Mysteries
- Henry Maudsley – Body and Mind
- Dadabhai Naoroji – The Wants and Means of India
- William Robinson – The Wild Garden
- Charles Dudley Warner - My Summer in a Garden and Calvin, A Study of Character

== Births ==
- January 3 – Henry Handel Richardson (Ethel Florence Lindesay Richardson), Australian novelist (died 1946)
- February 16 – Henric Streitman, Romanian essayist and journalist (died 1950)
- March 5 – Frank Norris, American novelist (died 1902)
- April 7 – Gustav Landauer, German philosopher and revolutionary (murdered 1919)
- June 25 – Erskine Childers, Irish novelist (executed 1922)
- July 27 – Hilaire Belloc, French-born English writer, poet and satirist (died 1953)
- October 18 – Petre P. Negulescu, Romanian philosopher (died 1951)
- October 22 (October 10 OS) – Ivan Bunin, Russian-born writer, recipient of Nobel Prize in Literature (died 1953)
- October 29 – Gerald Duckworth, English publisher (died 1937)
- December 17 – Ioan A. Bassarabescu, Romanian short story writer and politician (died 1952)
- December 18 – Saki (Hector Hugh Munro), English short story writer and dramatist (killed in action 1916)

== Deaths ==
- January 21 – Alexander Herzen, Russian writer (born 1812)
- February 25 – Henrik Hertz, Danish poet (born 1797)
- April 16 – Rallou Karatza, Greek Wallachian translator and theatrical promoter (born 1799)
- April 24 – Louisa Stuart Costello, Irish writer on history and travel (born 1799)
- June 9 – Charles Dickens, English novelist (born 1812)
- June 11 – William Gilmore Simms, American poet, novelist and historian (born 1806)
- June 24 – Adam Lindsay Gordon, Australian poet (born 1833)
- July 19 – Benjamin Thorpe, scholar of Old English (born c. 1782)
- July 20 – Jules de Goncourt, French novelist and critic (syphilis, born 1830)
- July 24 – Anders Abraham Grafström, Swedish poet and historian (born 1790)
- July 30 – Aasmund Olavsson Vinje, Norwegian journalist and poet (born 1818)
- September 12 – Fitz Hugh Ludlow, American author and explorer (born 1836)
- September 23 – Prosper Mérimée, French writer (b. 1803)
- November 4 – Comte de Lautreamont (Isidore Lucien Ducasse), French poet and writer (born 1846)
- December 5 – Alexandre Dumas, père, French novelist (born 1802)
