= Pantarchy =

Pantarchy is a social theory proposed by Stephen Pearl Andrews in the 19th century. Andrews was considered the "American rival of Comte," because of his work on an all-encompassing philosophy of universology, and his political proposals had similar scope, combining elements of the individualist anarchism of Josiah Warren, whose works Andrews had edited, with a strong belief in natural hierarchy.

The plan of this party proposes a NEW SPIRITUAL GOVERNMENT FOR THE WORLD, called THE PANTARCHY, which includes a NEW CHURCH and a NEW STATE, with, to use his own language, " all other subordinate institutions, educational, informational, &c., which are universal in their scope and nature, and which can be devised and established as subservient to the collective wants of mankind."

Andrews scheme of pantarchy was discussed in a series of "Weekly Bulletins" in the pages of Woodhull and Claflin's Weekly. The American Section 12 of the International Workingmen's Association adopted some of Andrews' proposals.

== See also ==
- Stephen Pearl Andrews
- Victoria Woodhull
- Anarchism
