= Psychometry (paranormal) =

Aspect of extrasensory perception

In parapsychology, psychometry (from Greek: ψυχή, psukhē, "spirit, soul" and μέτρον, metron, "measure"), also known as token-object reading, or psychoscopy, is a form of extrasensory perception characterized by the purported ability to glean accurate knowledge of an object's history by making physical contact with that object. Supporters assert that an object may have an energy field that transfers knowledge regarding that object's history.

There is no evidence that psychometry exists, and the concept has been widely criticized.

== History ==
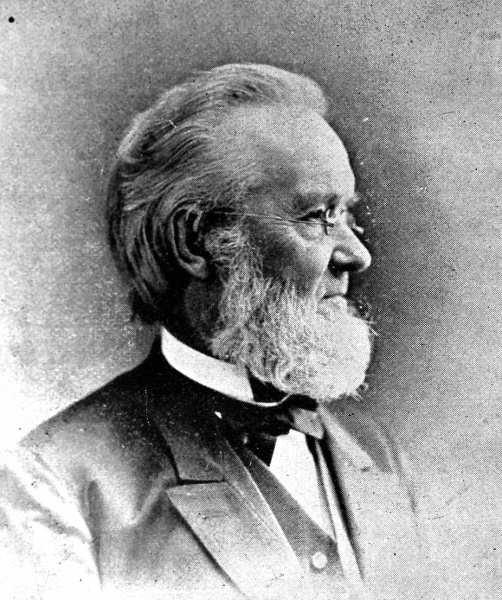
Joseph Rodes Buchanan

Joseph Rodes Buchanan coined the word "psychometry" (measuring the soul) in 1842. Buchanan developed the idea that all things give off an emanation.

The Past is entombed in the Present! The world is its own enduring monument; and that which is true of its physical, is likewise true of its mental career. The discoveries of Psychometry will enable us to explore the history of man, as those of geology enable us to explore the history of the earth. There are mental fossils for psychologists as well as mineral fossils for the geologists; and I believe that hereafter the psychologist and the geologist will go hand in hand — the one portraying the earth, its animals and its vegetation, while the other portrays the human beings who have roamed over its surface in the shadows, and the darkness of primeval barbarism! Aye, the mental telescope is now discovered which may pierce the depths of the past and bring us in full view of the grand and tragic passages of ancient history!

Buchanan asserted that his particular psychism would supersede empiric science. He wrote a comprehensive treatise, Manual of Psychometry: the Dawn of a New Civilization (1885), detailing how the direct knowledge of psychometry would be applied to and affect the many various branches of science.

The thermometer measures caloric (thermo temperature). The barometer measures the weight (baro, weight) of the atmosphere; the electrometer measures electric conditions; the psychometer measures the soul (psyche). In the case of Psychometry, however, the measuring assumes a new character, as the object measured and the measuring instrument are the same psychic element, and its measuring power is not limited to the psychic as it was developed in the first experiments, but has appeared by successive investigation to manifest a wider and wider area of power, until it became apparent that this psychic capacity was really the measure of all things in the Universe.

Buchanan continued to promote psychometry throughout his life and his followers believed that it would revolutionize science in a comprehensive way as "the dawn of a new civilization". Buchanan's work on psychometry was continued by the geologist William Denton (1823–1883). In 1863, Denton published a book on the subject The Soul of Things. Their work was criticized by Joseph Jastrow as based on delusion and wishful thinking.

Others, such as Stephen Pearl Andrews, who promoted Psychometry along with his own new science of Universology, built upon Buchanan's ideas. As a lecturer, Andrews asserted that such inquiries, as paraphrased by an 1878 New York Times article, "demonstrated that the sympathy between the mind and body is an exact science".

In the later nineteenth century demonstrations of psychometry became a popular part of stage acts and séances, with participants providing a personal object for "reading" by a medium or psychic. It is also commonly offered at psychic fairs as a type of psychic reading.

== Scientific reception ==
Skeptics explain alleged successes of psychometry by cold reading and confirmation bias. Skeptic Robert Todd Carroll describes psychometry as a pseudoscience.

The majority of police departments polled do not use psychics and do not consider them credible or useful on cases. Proponents of psychometry have argued that psychic detectives have been used by law enforcement agencies on specific cases. However, psychologist Leonard Zusne has noted that "enquiries with police officials [...] reveal that the involvement of psychics has not been very helpful, and that second-hand reports of it are often in gross error."

== Use in fiction ==
Psychometry has been used in a number of fictional works, often as a plot device. The device can either be an aspect of supernatural or superhuman abilities. Examples of the powers use in media includes The Dead Zone, He Is Psychometric, Force sensitive characters in the Star Wars franchise, and comic book characters such as Adrienne Frost and Hindsight.

== See also ==
- Law of contagion
- List of topics characterized as pseudoscience
- Outline of parapsychology
- Precognition
- Remote viewing
- Retrocognition
