= Consilience =

Principle about evidence

In science and history, consilience (also convergence of evidence or concordance of evidence) is the principle that evidence from independent, unrelated sources can "converge" on strong conclusions. That is, when multiple sources of evidence are in agreement, the conclusion can be very strong even when none of the individual sources of evidence is significantly so on its own. Most established scientific knowledge is supported by a convergence of evidence: if not, the evidence is comparatively weak, and there will probably not be a strong scientific consensus.

The principle is based on unity of knowledge; measuring the same result by several different methods should lead to the same answer. For example, it should not matter whether one measures distances within the Giza pyramid complex by laser rangefinding, by satellite imaging, or with a metre-stick – in all three cases, the answer should be approximately the same. For the same reason, different dating methods in geochronology should concur, a result in chemistry should not contradict a result in geology, etc.

The word consilience was originally coined as the phrase "consilience of inductions" by William Whewell (consilience refers to a "jumping together" of knowledge). The word comes from Latin com- "together" and -siliens "jumping" (as in resilience).

== Description ==
Consilience requires the use of independent methods of measurement, meaning that the methods have few shared characteristics. That is, the mechanism by which the measurement is made is different; each method is dependent on an unrelated natural phenomenon. For example, the accuracy of laser range-finding measurements is based on the scientific understanding of lasers, while satellite pictures and metre-sticks (or yardsticks) rely on different phenomena. Because the methods are independent, when one of several methods is in error, it is very unlikely to be in error in the same way as any of the other methods, and a difference between the measurements will be observed. (Note: Note that this is not the same as performing the same measurement several times. While repetition does provide evidence because it shows that the measurement is being performed consistently, it would not be consilience and would be more vulnerable to error.) If the scientific understanding of the properties of lasers was inaccurate, then the laser measurement would be inaccurate but the others would not.

As a result, when several different methods agree, this is strong evidence that none of the methods are in error and the conclusion is correct. This is because of a greatly reduced likelihood of errors: for a consensus estimate from multiple measurements to be wrong, the errors would have to be similar for all samples and all methods of measurement, which is extremely unlikely. Random errors will tend to cancel out as more measurements are made, due to regression to the mean; systematic errors will be detected by differences between the measurements and will also tend to cancel out since the direction of the error will still be random. This is how scientific theories reach high confidence—over time, they build up a large degree of evidence which converges on the same conclusion. (Note: Statistically, if three different tests are each 90% reliable when they give a positive result, a positive result from all three tests would be 99.9% reliable; five such tests would be 99.999% reliable, and so forth. This requires the tests to be statistically independent, analogous to the requirement for independence in the methods of measurement.)

When results from different strong methods do appear to conflict, this is treated as a serious problem to be reconciled. For example, in the 19th century, the Sun appeared to be no more than 20 million years old, but the Earth appeared to be no less than 300 million years (resolved by the discovery of nuclear fusion and radioactivity, and the theory of quantum mechanics); or current attempts to resolve theoretical differences between quantum mechanics and general relativity.

== Significance ==
Because of consilience, the strength of evidence for any particular conclusion is related to how many independent methods are supporting the conclusion, as well as how different these methods are. Those techniques with the fewest (or no) shared characteristics provide the strongest consilience and result in the strongest conclusions. This also means that confidence is usually strongest when considering evidence from different fields because the techniques are usually very different.

For example, the theory of evolution is supported by a convergence of evidence from genetics, molecular biology, paleontology, geology, biogeography, comparative anatomy, comparative physiology, and many other fields. In fact, the evidence within each of these fields is itself a convergence providing evidence for the theory. As a result, to disprove evolution, most or all of these independent lines of evidence would have to be found to be in error. The strength of the evidence, considered together as a whole, results in the strong scientific consensus that the theory is correct. In a similar way, evidence about the history of the universe is drawn from astronomy, astrophysics, planetary geology, and physics.

Finding similar conclusions from multiple independent methods is also evidence for the reliability of the methods themselves, because consilience eliminates the possibility of all potential errors that do not affect all the methods equally. This is also used for the validation of new techniques through comparison with the consilient ones. If only partial consilience is observed, this allows for the detection of errors in methodology; any weaknesses in one technique can be compensated for by the strengths of the others. Alternatively, if using more than one or two techniques for every experiment is infeasible, some of the benefits of consilience may still be obtained if it is well-established that these techniques usually give the same result.

Consilience is important across all of science, including the social sciences, and is often used as an argument for scientific realism by philosophers of science. Each branch of science studies a subset of reality that depends on factors studied in other branches. Atomic physics underlies the workings of chemistry, which studies emergent properties that in turn are the basis of biology. Psychology is not separate from the study of properties emergent from the interaction of neurons and synapses. Sociology, economics, and anthropology are each, in turn, studies of properties emergent from the interaction of countless individual humans. The concept that all the different areas of research are studying one real, existing universe is an apparent explanation of why scientific knowledge determined in one field of inquiry has often helped in understanding other fields.

== Deviations ==
Consilience does not forbid deviations: in fact, since not all experiments are perfect, some deviations from established knowledge are expected. However, when the convergence is strong enough, then new evidence inconsistent with the previous conclusion is not usually enough to outweigh that convergence. Without an equally strong convergence on the new result, the weight of evidence will still favor the established result. This means that the new evidence is most likely to be wrong.

Science denialism (for example, AIDS denialism) is often based on a misunderstanding of this property of consilience. A denier may promote small gaps not yet accounted for by the consilient evidence, or small amounts of evidence contradicting a conclusion without accounting for the pre-existing strength resulting from consilience. More generally, to insist that all evidence converge precisely with no deviations would be naïve falsificationism, equivalent to considering a single contrary result to falsify a theory when another explanation, such as equipment malfunction or misinterpretation of results, is much more likely. (Note: More generally, anything which results in a false positive or false negative.)

== In history ==
Historical evidence also converges in an analogous way. For example: if five ancient historians, none of whom knew each other, all claim that Julius Caesar seized power in Rome in 49 BCE, this is strong evidence in favor of that event occurring even if each individual historian is only partially reliable. By contrast, if the same historian had made the same claim five times in five different places (and no other types of evidence were available), the claim is much weaker because it originates from a single source. The evidence from the ancient historians could also converge with evidence from other fields, such as archaeology: for example, evidence that many senators fled Rome at the time, that the battles of Caesar's civil war occurred, and so forth.

Consilience has also been discussed in reference to Holocaust denial.

"We [have now discussed] eighteen proofs all converging on one conclusion...the deniers shift the burden of proof to historians by demanding that each piece of evidence, independently and without corroboration between them, prove the Holocaust. Yet no historian has ever claimed that one piece of evidence proves the Holocaust. We must examine the collective whole."

That is, individually the evidence may underdetermine the conclusion, but together they overdetermine it. A similar way to state this is that to ask for one particular piece of evidence in favor of a conclusion is a flawed question.

== Outside the sciences ==
In addition to the sciences, consilience can be important to the arts, ethics and religion. E.O. Wilson argues as to the importance of biology in the process of artistic innovation.

== History of the concept ==
Consilience has its roots in the ancient Greek concept of an intrinsic orderliness that governs our cosmos, inherently comprehensible by logical process, a vision at odds with mystical views in many cultures that surrounded the Hellenes. The rational view was recovered during the high Middle Ages, separated from theology during the Renaissance and found its apogee in the Age of Enlightenment.

Whewell's definition was that:

The Consilience of Inductions takes place when an Induction, obtained from one class of facts, coincides with an Induction obtained from another different class. Thus Consilience is a test of the truth of the Theory in which it occurs.

More recent descriptions include:

"Where there is a convergence of evidence, where the same explanation is implied, there is increased confidence in the explanation. Where there is divergence, then either the explanation is at fault or one or more of the sources of information is in error or requires reinterpretation."

"Proof is derived through a convergence of evidence from numerous lines of inquiry—multiple, independent inductions, all of which point to an unmistakable conclusion."

== Edward O. Wilson ==
Although the concept of consilience in Whewell's sense was widely discussed by philosophers of science, the term was unfamiliar to the broader public until the end of the 20th century, when it was revived in Consilience: The Unity of Knowledge, a 1998 book by the author and biologist E. O. Wilson, as an attempt to bridge the cultural gap between the sciences and the humanities that was the subject of C. P. Snow's The Two Cultures and the Scientific Revolution (1959). Wilson believed that "the humanities, ranging from philosophy and history to moral reasoning, comparative religion, and interpretation of the arts, will draw closer to the sciences and partly fuse with them" with the result that science and the scientific method, from within this fusion, would not only explain the physical phenomenon but also provide moral guidance and be the ultimate source of all truths.

Wilson held that with the rise of the modern sciences, the sense of unity gradually was lost in the increasing fragmentation and specialization of knowledge in the last two centuries. He asserted that the sciences, humanities, and arts have a common goal: to give a purpose to understand the details, to lend to all inquirers "a conviction, far deeper than a mere working proposition, that the world is orderly and can be explained by a small number of natural laws." An important point made by Wilson is that hereditary human nature and evolution itself profoundly affect the evolution of culture, in essence, a sociobiological concept. Wilson's concept is a much broader notion of consilience than that of Whewell, who was merely pointing out that generalizations invented to account for one set of phenomena often account for others as well.

A parallel view lies in the term universology, which literally means "the science of the universe." Universology was first promoted for the study of the interconnecting principles and truths of all domains of knowledge by Stephen Pearl Andrews, a 19th-century utopian futurist and anarchist.

== See also ==
- Appeal to tradition – Logical fallacy in which a thesis is deemed correct on the basis of tradition
- Appeal to authority – Logical fallacy
- Equifinality – Principle in systems theory
- Philosophy of science § Coherentism – Branch of philosophy
- Scientific method – Interplay between observation, experiment, and theory in science
- Syncretism – Combination of beliefs and traditions
- Tree of knowledge system – Map of history from Big Bang to present
- Unified Science
