= Joseph Buchanan (philosopher) =

- Born: August 24, 1785
- Died: 1829

Joseph Buchanan (August 24, 1785 – 1829) was an American materialist philosopher, who taught at Transylvania University. He was the father of spiritualist Joseph Rodes Buchanan. He wrote The Philosophy of Human Nature (1812), "one of the earliest systematic and consistent presentations of materialism to be published in America." Buchanan established a Pestalozzian Seminary in 1814. He died in a yellow fever epidemic.
