= Introspection by analogy =

Technique for studying animal behaviour

Proposed by George John Romanes (1848–1894), introspection by analogy is "a technique for studying animal behaviour by assuming that the same mental process that occurs in the observer's mind also occurs in the animals mind".

== See also ==
- Animal cognition
- Cognitive ethology
