= Cridge =

Cridge is a surname. Notable people with the surname include:

- Annie Denton Cridge (1825–1875), British suffragist, socialist, lecturer, and author
- Edward Cridge (1817–1913), British-Canadian social reformer and clergyman
- Geoff Cridge (born 1995), New Zealand rugby union player
