= Lilian Leland =

American who traveled around the world solo

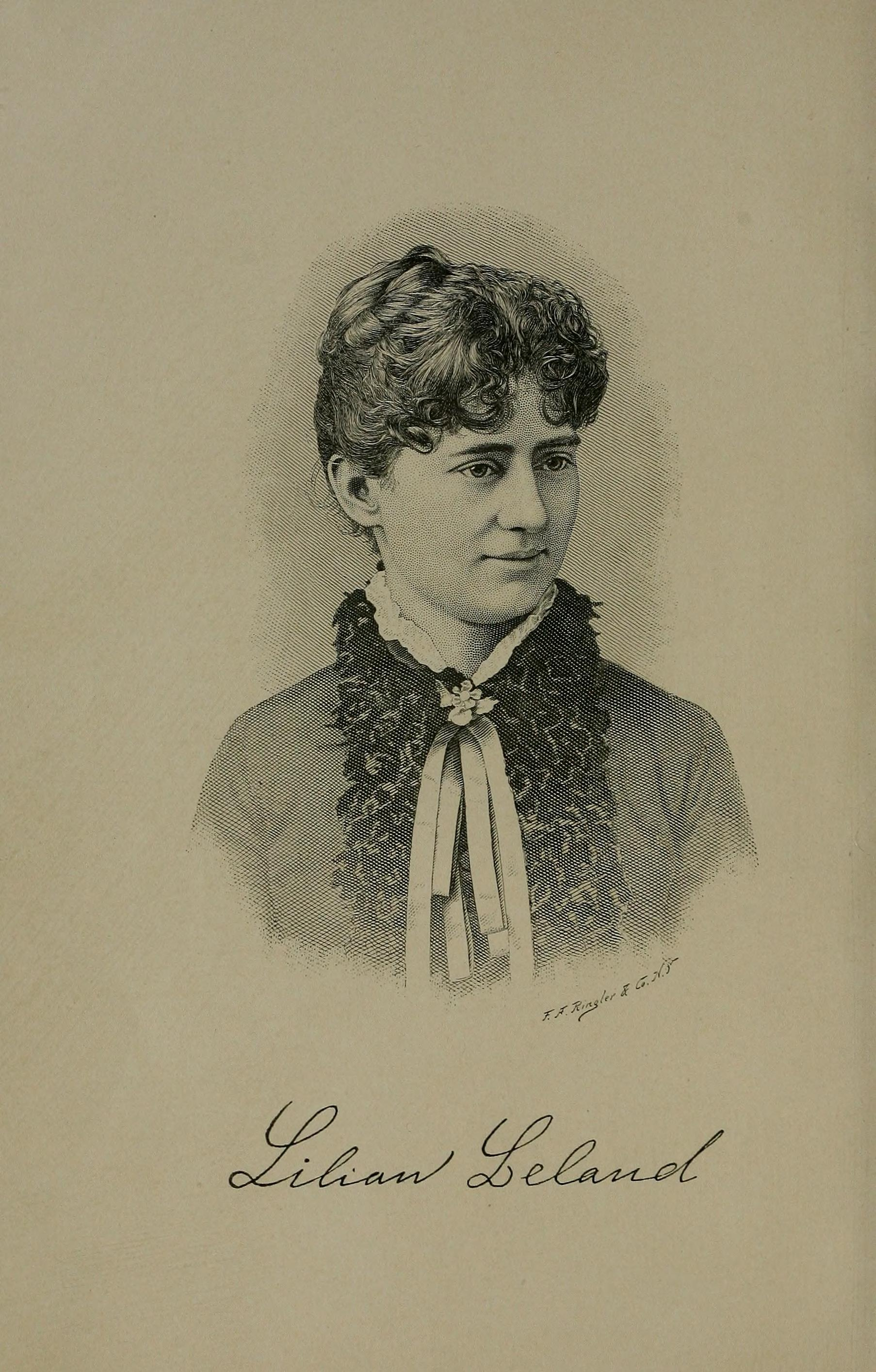
- Born: New York, United States; October 16, 1857
- Died: April 4, 1934 (aged 76); Queens, New York
- Occupations: Writer, traveler
- Notable work: Travelling Alone: A Woman's Journey Round the World (1890)

Lilian Leland (16 October 1857 – 4 April 1934) was an American writer and traveler, who became well known for her 60,000 mile solo journey by land and sea, around the world.

== Life ==
Rachel Lilian Leland was born in New York on 16 October 1857, the daughter of Mary and Theron Leland. Theron Leland was a writer, lecturer, and freethinker, who was secretary of the Liberal League. He was also one of the first phonographic reporters in America. Mary A. Leland was among the first American women to study medicine, becoming a lecturer in anatomy as early as 1852.

Lilian Leland was first taught by her father, and then attended school in New York. Her desire to travel came from reading The Merchant of Venice and a book about the Indian Archipelago, entitled The Prison of Weltevreden.

At the age of 25, Leland embarked on a solo journey of nearly sixty thousand miles, which lasted for nearly two years. The only other woman recorded to have taken a comparable journey alone at that time was Ida Pfeiffer. Leland subsequently published Travelling Alone: A Woman's Journey Round the World (1890) compiled from letters she wrote along the way.

Leland married H. L. Andrews, the son of Stephen Pearl Andrews, abolitionist and freethinker.

Samuel Porter Putnam described her as "Always pleasant and cheerful in appearance, and never, under any circumstances, uttering a complaint, she is, at the same time, possessed of a quiet determination that carries her smilingly and safely over all difficulties."

Leland died in Queens, New York on 4 April 1934 from pneumonia.
