= Unified Science =

"Unified Science" can refer to any of three related strands in contemporary thought.

- Belief in the unity of science was a central tenet of logical positivism. Different logical positivists construed this doctrine in several different ways, e.g. as a reductionist thesis, that the objects investigated by the special sciences reduce to the objects of a common, putatively more basic domain of science, usually thought to be physics; as the thesis that all of the theories and results of the various sciences can or ought to be expressed in a common language or "universal slang"; or as the thesis that all the special sciences share a common method.
- The writings of Edward Haskell and a few associates, seeking to rework science into a single discipline employing a common artificial language. This work culminated in the 1972 publication of Full Circle: The Moral Force of Unified Science. The vast part of the work of Haskell and his contemporaries remains unpublished, however. Timothy Wilken and Anthony Judge have recently revived and extended the insights of Haskell and his coworkers.
- Unified Science has been a consistent thread since the 1940s in Howard T. Odum's systems ecology and the associated Emergy Synthesis, modeling the "ecosystem": the geochemical, biochemical, and thermodynamic processes of the lithosphere and biosphere. Modeling such earthly processes in this manner requires a science uniting geology, physics, biology, and chemistry (H.T.Odum 1995). With this in mind, Odum developed a common language of science based on electronic schematics, with applications to ecology economic systems in mind (H.T.Odum 1994).

== See also ==
- Consilience — the unification of knowledge, e.g. science and the humanities
- Tree of knowledge system
