= Sherman Foote Denton =

American author, lepidopterist, scientific illustrator and naturalist (1856–1937)

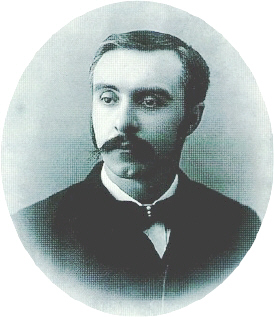
- Born: September 24, 1856; Dayton, Ohio, USA
- Died: June 24, 1937 (aged 80); Wellesley, Massachusetts, USA
- Employer: Denton Brothers Butterflies Company
- Known for: Scientific illustrations

Sherman Foote Denton (September 24, 1856 – June 24, 1937) was an American naturalist, illustrator, specimen collector, inventor, writer, and entrepreneur. Along with his brothers Shelley Wright and Robert Winsford, he started Denton Brothers Butterflies Company, which sold mounted butterfly specimens. Individual butterflies were mounted on plaster under a glass frame, a technique that he patented and known as "Denton mounts".

== Early life ==
Poster for William Denton's lectures made by Sherman, c. 1870

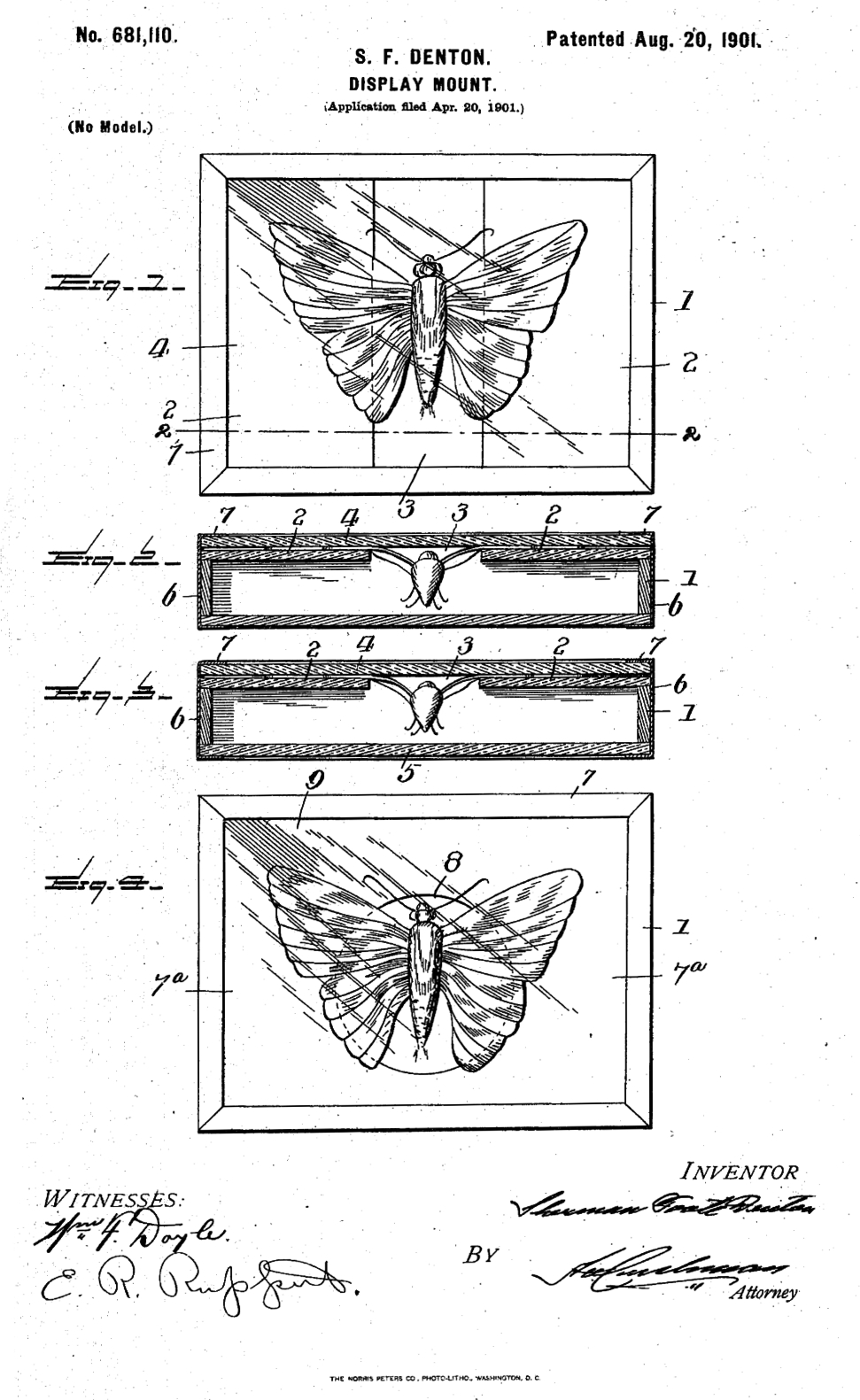
US Patent 681110A, 1901

Denton was born in Dayton, Ohio, the first son of Elizabeth M. née Foote (1826–1916) and William Denton (1823–1883) a geologist who became a promoter of psychic seeing abilities that he claimed his wife possessed in strong measure but one that existed in everyone. The family interest in natural history was inculcated in the children early. Sherman and his brother Shelley traveled with their father who gave lectures around the world. William claimed that Sherman could draw the evolutionary history of birds through psychic abilities. Sherman participated in experiments by his father who claimed that rocks and other inanimate objects held a photographic record that sensitive people could see. Sherman drew several birds that he claimed to be able to see based on an examination of fossil tracks from Connecticut. The senior Denton died from fever in 1883 while on a tour in Papua New Guinea. The two sons collected natural history specimens extensively on the three year tour.

Sherman wrote a book based on his life experiences - Incidents of a collector's rambles in Australia, New Zealand, and New Guinea.

== Career ==
Sherman Denton returned home and then joined the US Fish Commission working as an artist who also worked on the collection and mounting of specimens. He developed a patented technique for life-like mounting and prior to preparing them, he would produce careful watercolor paintings. His careful illustrations were praised for their accuracy. His illustrations included those of the now extinct Salvelinus agassizi under the name of "Canadian Red Trout". A subspecies of cuckoo-shrike Lalage leucomela insulicola was described by W.E. Clyde Todd on the basis of specimens collected by the Denton brothers in the Carnegie Museum.

Sherman invented and patented, in 1901, the mounting of lepidopteran specimens on a white plaster tablet under glass instead of the traditional pinning. Along with his brother, he sold numerous mounted specimens made by the Denton Brothers Company in Wellesley. He also produced numerous butterfly scale prints (also called lepidochromes). The two volume book As Nature Shows Them (1900) produced in a limited 500 copies made use of actual butterfly and moth wing transfers for the colored plates, with the body and legs hand-painted. Denton also took an interest in pearls, made a large collection of freshwater pearls, and published a book on pearls in 1916. His brother Shelley worked as a curator of the bird collections at Cambridge, Massachusetts around 1887 and catalogued the collections of William Brewster (1851–1919).

== Death ==
Denton died at his Wellesley farm and was buried in Woodlawn Cemetery. The street in Wellesley where the family lived was later renamed as Denton Road. Denton mounts of nearly 1400 specimens were gifted by their heirs to the Wellesley Historical Society. Vladimir Nabokov wrote about his own interest in butterflies and noted that his aunts would gift him "ridiculous presents such as Denton mounts of resplendent but really quite ordinary insects." In 1941, Nabokov made a visit to the collections held at 11 Denton Road and commented that they were "marvellous specimens, but with ... catastrophic labels and without localities."

Some chromolithographs and lepidochromes
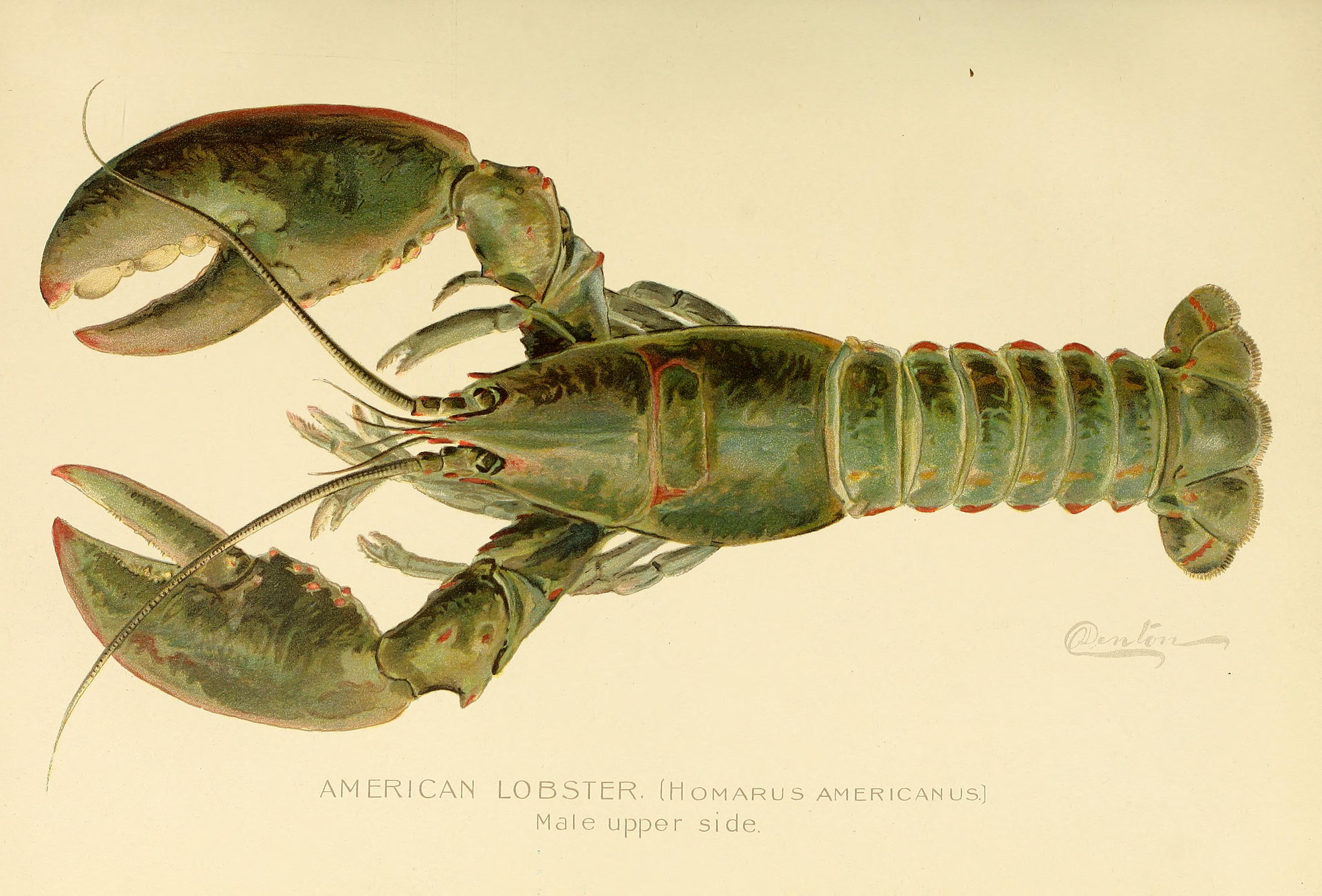
American lobster

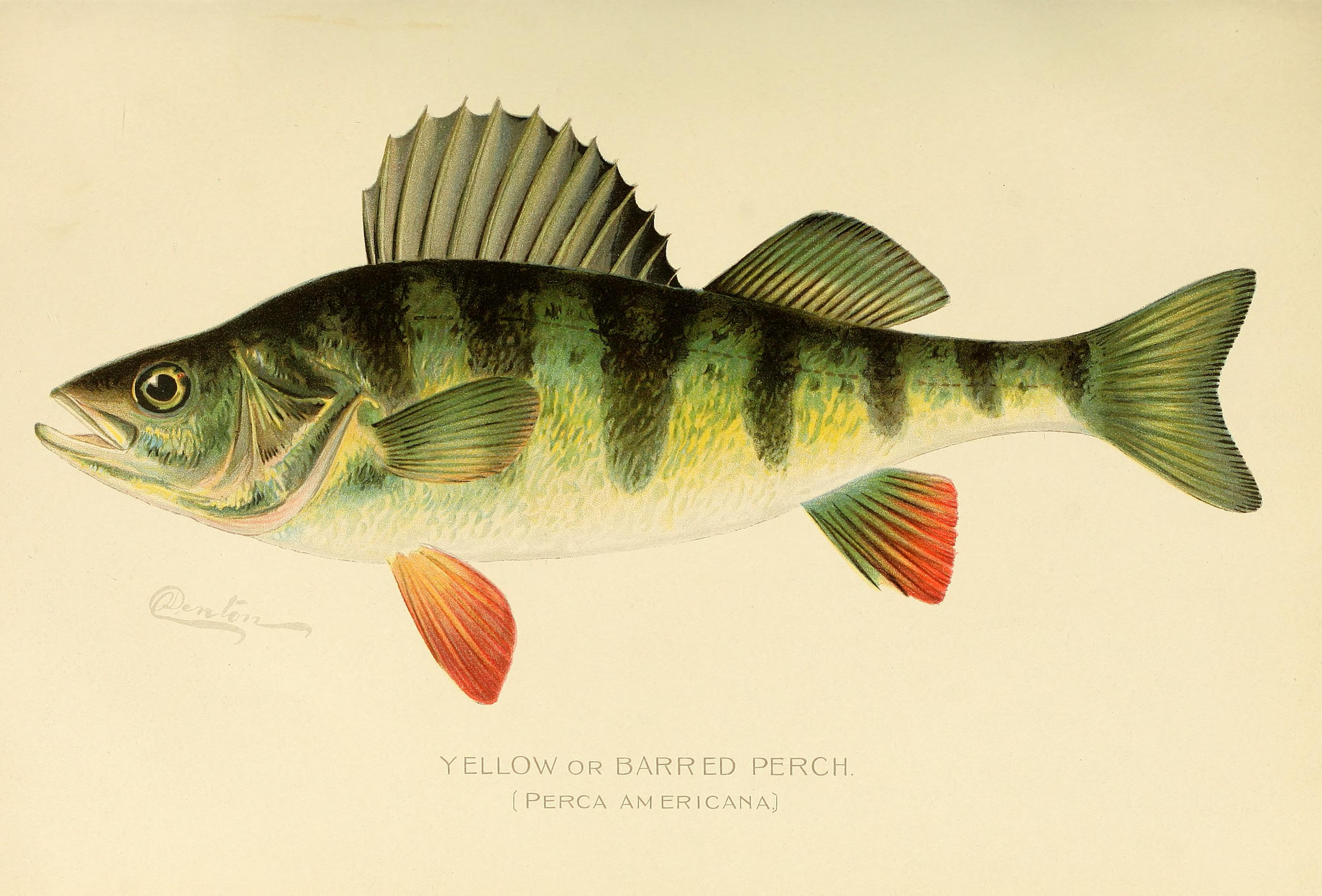
Barred perch

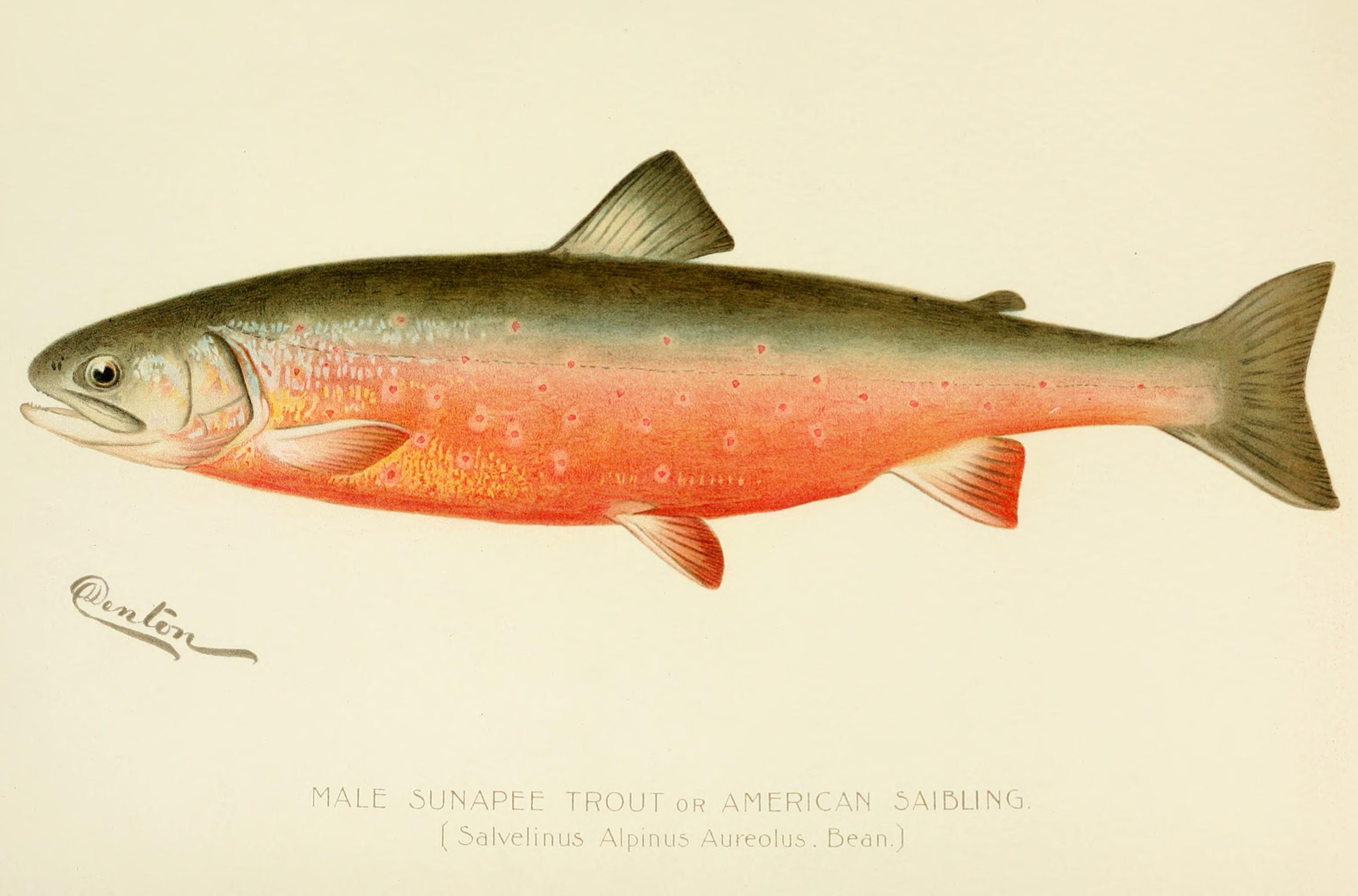
American saibling

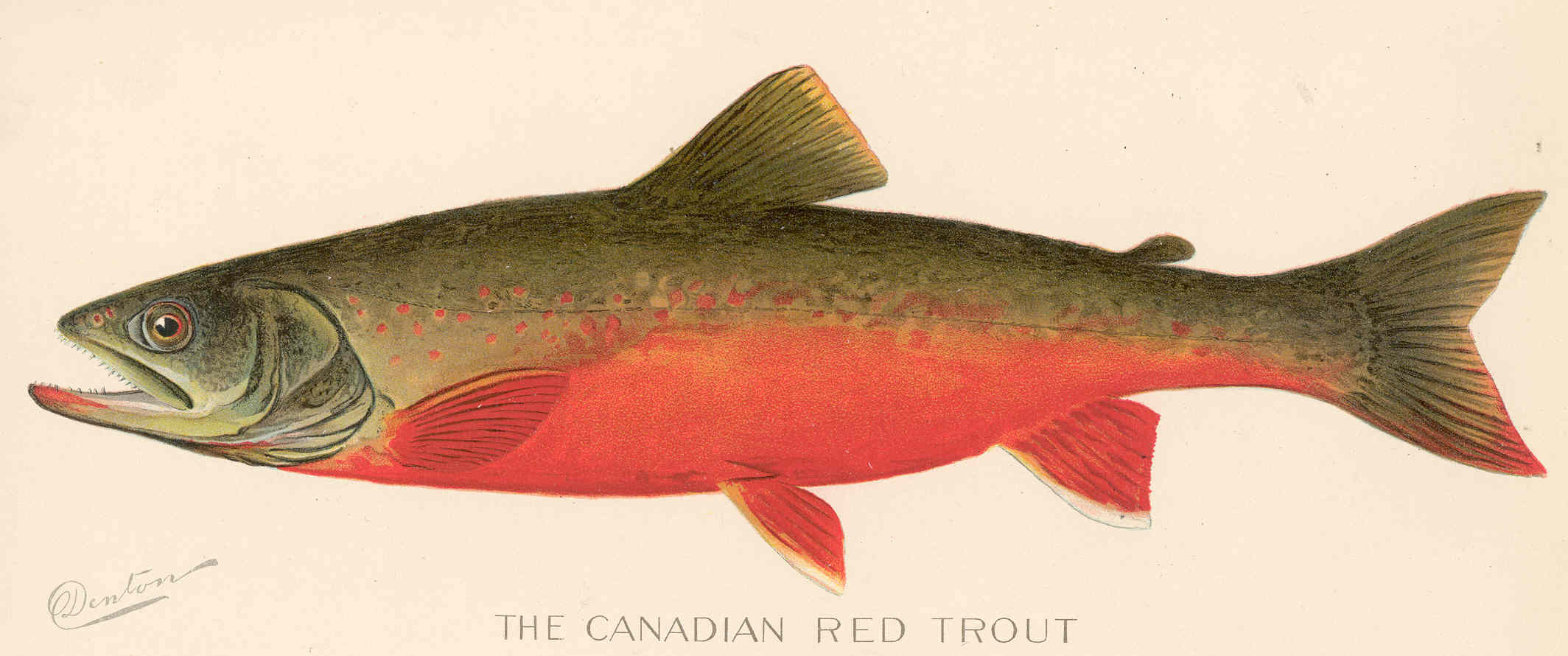
The now extinct Salvelinus agassizi

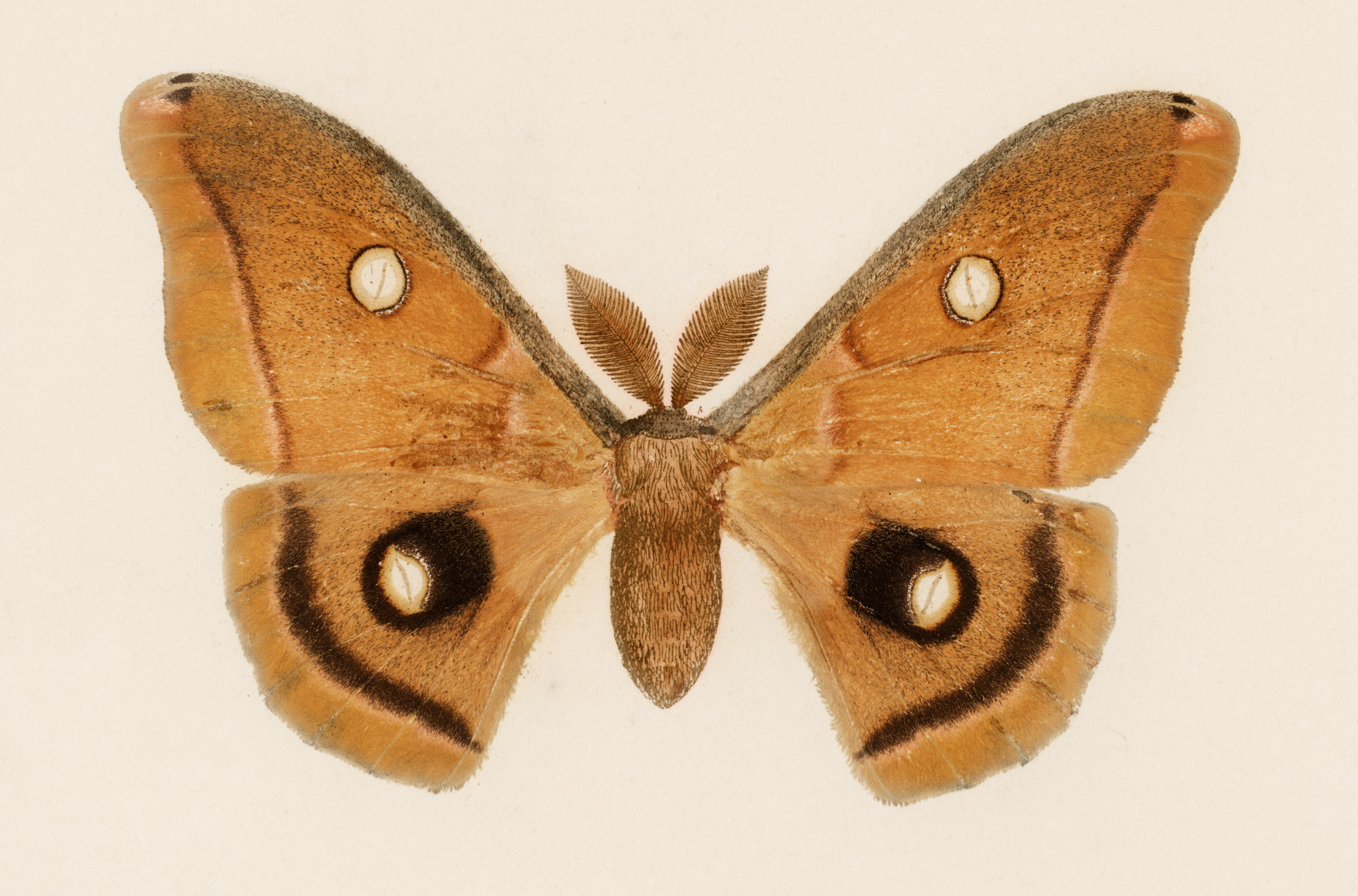
Lepidochrome (scale print) of the Polyphemus moth

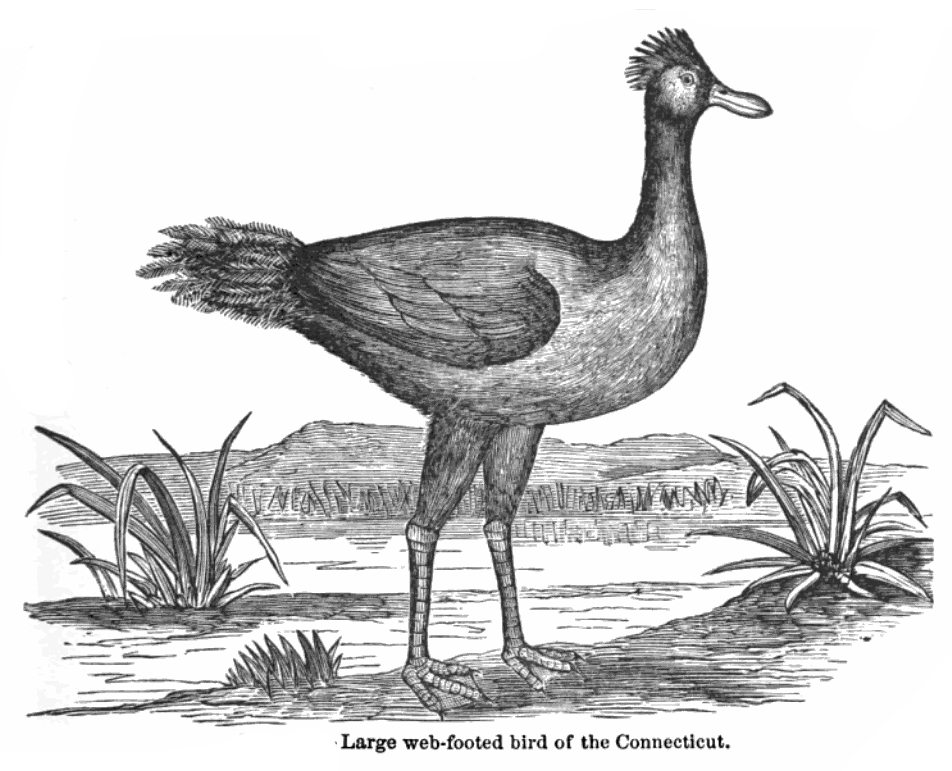
"Psychic" rendering of an extinct bird drawn based on fossil tracks from Connecticut
