= Edward Haskell =

Synergic scientist

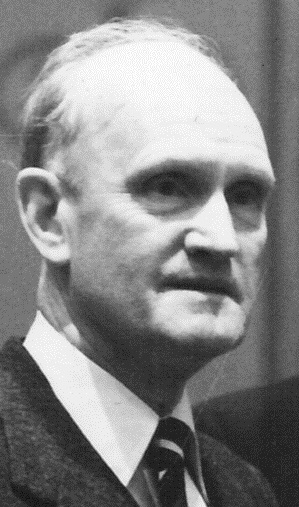
- Born: August 24, 1906; Phillipopolis
- Died: 1990 (aged 83–84)

Academic background
- Education: Oberlin College

Academic work
- Main interests: Unified Science
- Notable works: Full Circle — The Moral Force of Unified Science

Edward Fröhlich Haskell (August 24, 1906 – 1990) was a synergic scientist who dedicated his life to the unification of human knowledge into a single discipline.

== Biography ==
Haskell was born in Phillipopolis, now Plovdiv, Bulgaria. His mother was a Swiss missionary, Elisabeth Fröhlich, who married an American missionary, Edward Bell Haskell, who himself was born in Bulgaria of American missionary parents. During his childhood, the family traveled widely throughout Europe (as a result he learned to speak six languages), before returning to the United States. Haskell attended Oberlin College in 1929, where he met Willard Quine who became a lifelong friend. After obtaining his B.A. in 1929, Haskell did a year of graduate studies at Columbia University.

While hitchhiking during his days as an Oberlin student, Haskell met two wealthy sisters named Reynolds; they were from Wilkes Barre, Pennsylvania. He so impressed them with his ideas and originality that they set up a trust fund to help support him. This situation appears to have led Haskell to disdain pursuing his research within the context of conventional employment. He lived most of his life alone in a cramped and cluttered student apartment near Columbia University, purchased for him by his half-brother Douglass Haskell and sister-in-law Helen Haskell. Haskell maintained close relations with both his full and half brothers and sisters throughout his life. Married twice, he had no children of his own.

Haskell employed the leisure afforded him by his good fortune to travel and write a book, Lance—A Novel about Multicultural Men (published in 1941) before resuming his graduate studies, this time at Harvard University and the University of Chicago. Although he became a Fellow at University of Chicago in 1940, he never completed his thesis and was not awarded the Ph.D. He left Chicago to teach sociology and anthropology at the University of Denver and Brooklyn College. In 1948, he left teaching to devote himself full-time to private research.

Haskell established the Council for Unified Research and Education (C.U.R.E., Inc.) in 1948, a non-profit research organization for the unification of science and education, which he ran until it was dissolved in the mid-1980s. Among its members were Harold Cassidy, Willard Quine, Arthur Jensen, and Jere Clark. CURE's goal was the synthesis of all knowledge into a single discipline, and they established a body of work called "The Unified Science". Haskell was the guiding light of CURE, and the originator of most of its seminal concepts. In 1972, Haskell published his Full Circle—The Moral Force of Unified Science. This book has been out of print for many years, but is now available online, gratis. The greater part of Haskell's work on Unified Science work remains unpublished.

Throughout his life, Haskell taught short courses and seminars on Unified Science at Columbia University, West Virginia University, Southern Connecticut State College, Drew University, and the New School for Social Research.

Haskell died shortly after suffering an incapacitating stroke in 1990.

== Work ==
Among the important concepts Haskell put forward were:

- The 9 Co-Actions.
- The three classes of relationships (positive, negative, and neutral) - recognising the Neutral class of relationships as of equal importance to Adversity and Synergy, not just the boundary between them.
- The Co-Action Compass as a map or diagram showing the entropic, neutral, or synergetic relationships between positive, negative, and neutral entities.
- The Moral Law of the Unified Science — the restatement of the spiritual concept of karma ("As you sow, so shall you reap") as a scientific law of Nature that applies in all the kingdoms of nature, inanimate as well as biological and human
- Evolution as a systems hierarchy
- A variant of the Great Chain of Being, namely the sequence light, particle, atom, molecule, plant, animal and human. Also see the related work by Arthur M. Young, Arthur O. Lovejoy, and Ken Wilber.

== Bibliography ==
- Haskell, Edward et al., Full Circle: The Moral Force of Unified Science, First Published in 1972, New York: Gordon and Breach. ISBN 0-677-12485-6. Republished by East West Publishing, Washington, DC, January 2024. ISBN 979-8-9877993-3-8
