= Douglas Haskell =

American magazine editor (1899–1979)

Douglas Putnam Haskell (1899 – August 11, 1979) was an American writer, architecture critic and magazine editor. Today he is widely known for his coinage of the term Googie architecture in a 1952 article in House and Home magazine.

== Biography ==
The son of American missionaries, Haskell was born in the Ottoman Empire, in the Balkan city of Monastir, now Bitola in the Republic of Macedonia. After returning to the United States, he graduated from Oberlin College in 1923. Shortly after this he became an editor at a national student magazine, The New Student.

In 1927, he joined the editorial staff of the New York City-based magazine Creative Art. He was the architecture critic of The Nation from 1929 until 1942, and was twice the associate editor of Architectural Record, in 1929–1930 and from 1943 to 1949. He wrote for numerous other publications, including the English journal Architectural Review and Harper's Magazine. In 1949, he became the editor of Architectural Forum, a post he held until his retirement in 1964. Under his editorship, the magazine published some of the early work of Jane Jacobs, whom Haskell hired as an associate editor in 1952.

Not only one of the noted champions of modern architecture in 1920s America, he was also a proponent of modern urban design, and he became a friend of planners such as Clarence Stein and Henry Wright and fellow critic Lewis Mumford.

Haskell was also an adjunct professor at Pratt Institute and at Columbia University. Although not an architect himself, he was admitted as a member of the American Institute of Architects. His papers are held at Columbia University's Avery Architectural and Fine Arts Library. He was the elder brother of scientist Edward Haskell.
