= William Denton (geologist) =

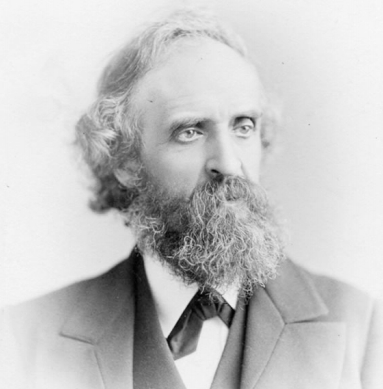

William Denton (8 January 1823 – 26 August 1883) was a self-taught geologist, author, preacher, and promoter of the occult practice of psychometry. He claimed that inanimate objects had souls or memories that he and other sensitive people could "read". He gave lectures on a wide range of topics. While returning from a speaking tour of Australia, he died of fever in Papua New Guinea.

== Life and work ==
Poster for Denton's travelling lectures made by his son Sherman Foote Denton, c. 1870

Denton was born at Darlington, County Durham. His parents were Robert Denton (1797-1851) and Jane Dixon Denton (1791-1854). Among his siblings were Annie Denton Cridge and Lizzie (later Seybold).

He was educated by his mother's friend Nelly Sedgwick who ran a small school and then attended the British Penny School in Darlington. He began to read from the age of four. At the age of eight he could recite chapters of the Bible from memory. A Baptist teacher, William Shotton, made an impression on him, by demonstrating a home-made galvanic cell.

At the age of fourteen he received workshop skills as an apprentice to Timothy Hackworth the pioneering railway and marine engineer at his Soho Works in Shildon. He was a member of the New Shildon Mechanics Institute. Around the same time, he read Lyell's geology and examined fossils in the workings of the Prince of Wales Tunnel, then being dug to allow a railway to pass beneath the market town of Shildon. When Hackworth asked his apprentice to repair equipment at a brewery, Denton refused claiming that its connection to alcohol made such work against his conscience. This resulting in his sacking.

He then attended the Normal School, and in his spare time lectured on temperance and preached in London. He took an interest in mesmerism and in radical unitarianism. This led to dismissal from the Normal School for heresy. His sister Annie Denton Cridge, who taught school, then helped him in his studies. He became an assistant at a school in London but lost the position after clashing with its Calvinist principal. He then became a clerk in the South Eastern Railroad Company. He gave lectures that drew crowds much to the ire of the church ministers.

In 1848 he and sister Annie emigrated to Philadelphia. He married Caroline Gilbert in 1849 and settled in Dayton where he gave lectures. His wife died the next year.

In December 1858, Denton debated James A. Garfield on the topic of the "Development Theory", which was an early version of theory of Evolution. Garfield was then professor and principal of the Western Reserve Eclectic Institute (now Hiram College) and a lay preacher of the Disciples of Christ. Each claimed to have won the debate.

He moved to Cincinnati where he wrote for "The Type of the Times". He married Elizabeth Melissa Foote who was working as compositor in the printing department there. (They had five children.) Later Elizabeth published Annie Denton Cridge's groundbreaking utopian feminist novel, Man's Rights. William and Elizabeth were two of the leading spiritualists in the U.S. in the mid-1800s.

Denton read the writings of Joseph Rodes Buchanan on mesmerism, spiritualism, and the idea of psychometry ("measuring the soul"). Denton claimed that he and wife Elizabeth were "psychometers" and that his sister Anne also was, saying like him, she could describe the physical characteristics of a writer of a letter by holding the letter in her hand.

He applied this "reading" ability to the study of geology, claiming that he could see the past when he held geological specimens. For instance, when he held a piece of Hawaiian lava, he said he could see the view there -- "the ocean and ships are sailing on it. This must be an island, for water is all around. Now I am turned from where I saw the vessels, and am looking at something most terrific. It seems as if an ocean of fire were pouring over a precipice, and boiling as it pours. The sight permeates my whole being, and inspires me with terror. I see it flow into the ocean and the water boils intensely."

Denton authored books on his psychometric studies -- The Soul of Things (1863) and Our Planet, Its Past and Future (1869). He wrote many other works as well, including Radical Discourses on Religious Subjects (1872) and Radical Rhymes (1881).

In 1881 he toured the United States and Australia, accompanied by his sons Shelley and Sherman who made an extensive collection of natural history specimens along the route. (Shelley developed a technique for preserving butterflies and was later asked to preserve the funeral flowers on Queen Victoria's coffin.)

On the way back to the U.S., William visited Papua New Guinea where he climbed a mountain. While in that country, he died from a fever. His remains were buried in the town of Berrigabadi.
