= Universology =

Universology literally means "the science of the universe." Popularizing universologic science was a life's work for 19th century intellectual Stephen Pearl Andrews, a futurist utopian. The word can be used synonymously with consilience, a term Edward Osborne Wilson has popularized with his writings elucidating the apparent unity of all knowledge.

In recent years, Dr. Mamoru Mohri, Japan's first astronaut and Director of Japan's National Museum of Emerging Science and Innovation, has popularized and expanded on universology. For Mohri the universological worldview was an epiphany after seeing the planet from space on two missions in the 1990s, and he has become the chief proponent of universology today. "Everything in this universe is part of an uninterrupted sequence of events" Mohri has said.

In 1872 Andrews published "The Basic Outline of Universology" which was subtitled "An introduction to the newly discovered science of the universe, its elementary principles, and the first stages of their development in the special sciences."

Ilya Romanovich Prigogine (born January 25, 1917) was a Belgian and American physicist and chemist who was born in Russia and became a Nobel Prize laureate in chemistry. In the book "Order Out of Chaos: Man's New Dialogue With Nature", which he co-wrote with Isabelle Stengers, another professor at Prigogine's group in the University of Brussels, Prigogine states:

"Altogether, we tend to accept the idea propelled by Dialectical Materialism, regarding the necessity of overcoming the antithesis of humane, historical realm and the material world, perceived as atemporal. We do believe, that the setting rapprochement of these opposites will have to be enhanced, as there will be new approaches which will outline the internally evolving Universe, which we are part of." A central aspect of the ways of "outlining the internally evolving Universe", that is what Universology is all about.
