= Man's Rights; Or, How Would You Like It? =

Science fiction novel by Annie Denton Cridge

- Author: Annie Denton Cridge
- Original title: Man's Rights; Or, How Would You Like It? Comprising Dreams
- Language: English
- Genre: Science fiction
- Published: 1870 (E. M. F. Denton)
- Pages: 44

Man's Rights; Or, How Would You Like It? Comprising Dreams is an Utopian feminist science fiction novel by American writer Annie Denton Cridge published in 1870. 44 pages long and published by William Denton, it was one of the first utopian science fiction novels published by a woman in the United States.

== Description ==
Cridge published Man's Rights in 1870. It was a novel of utopian science fiction and satire, and the first known feminist utopian novel written by a woman. The text describes a feminist utopia, where gender roles are reversed, women dominate and rule, and men are dominated and must organise to claim their rights.

== Resume ==
The text presents nine dreams experienced by a first-person female narrator. In the first seven dreams, she visits the planet Mars, where she discovers a society where traditional gender roles and stereotypes are reversed. The narrator witnesses the oppression of men on Mars and their struggle for equality. Although initially confined to the home and strictly controlled, they begin to work towards liberation after technological advances free them from some of their back-breaking domestic tasks. In the last two dreams, the narrator visits the United States of the future, led by a female president and with a balance of men and women in the US House of Representatives and the US Senate. Legislators have stopped fining and imprisoning prostitutes, and it is now the male clients who are arrested and sent to moral reformatories. Many women have taken up farming, and the nation has a bright economic future. The narrator concludes by asking whether this dream is not, after all, a prophecy.

== Bibliography ==
- Larbalestier, Justine, ed. (2006). Daughters of earth: feminist science fiction in the twentieth century. Middletown, Conn: Wesleyan University Press. ISBN 978-0-8195-6675-1. OCLC 62161157.
- Denton Cridge, Annie (2022). "Les Droits des hommes (ça vous plairait à vous ?". Quatre rêves, une poétique militante (in French). Translated by Leslie de Bont, Leslie. Nantes: éditions Bardane. pp. 19–49.
