= Joseph Rodes Buchanan =

American physician and professor (1814–1899)

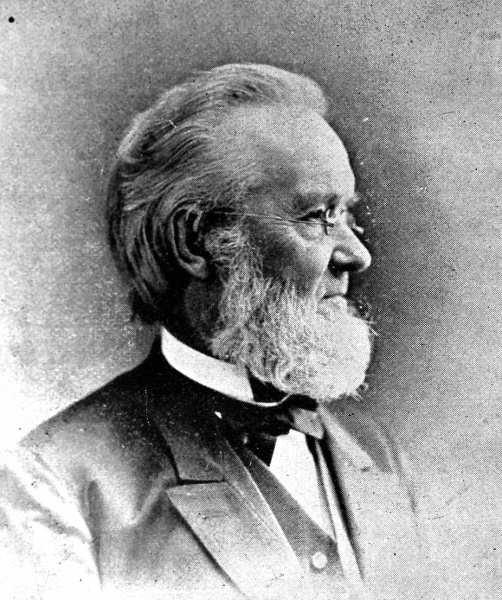
- Born: December 11, 1814; Frankfort, Kentucky, U.S.
- Died: December 26, 1899 (aged 85); San Jose, California, U.S.
- Resting place: Cincinnati, Ohio, U.S.
- Education: Transylvania University
- Employer: Eclectic Medical Institute
- Spouse: Anne Rowan (m. 1841)

Joseph Rodes Buchanan (December 11, 1814 – December 26, 1899) was an American physician and professor of physiology at the Eclectic Medical Institute in Cincinnati, Ohio. Buchanan proposed the terms Psychometry (soul measurement) and Sarcognomy for psychic abilities he claimed humans had. His promotion of paranormal powers in humans caught the public imagination of the period.

== Early life ==
Joseph Rodes Buchanan was born on December 11, 1814, in Frankfort, Kentucky to Dr. Joseph Buchanan. He attended Transylvania University and while studying medicine, he became interested in the structure and function of the brain.

== Career ==
Buchanan came to prominence in the 1840s when mesmerism and Spiritualism were popularized. He is given credit for coining the term "Psychometry" (soul-measuring) as the name of his own "science" whereby knowledge is acquired directly by the "psychometer" (the instrument of the soul). Having promoted his science from the 1840s onward in 1893 he released a comprehensive treatise entitled Manual of Psychometry: the Dawn of a New Civilization in which he predicted that Psychometry would eventually supersede and revolutionize every other field of science. Though himself a physician in lectures he denounced contemporary schools of medicine as "educated ignorance" while promoting Psychometry and appealing to Spiritualists. His work inspired other Spiritualism-based scientists such as Stephen Pearl Andrews.

In his Manual (1885) he defined psychometry as "the development and exercise of the divine faculties in man, a demonstration of the old conception of poetry and mystic philosophy as to the Divine interior of the human soul, and the marvelous approximation of man toward omniscience.” It has been suggested that his ideas may have been related to the contemporary fascination with photography, particularly the daguerreotype. He claimed that psychometrically gifted individuals could identify substances without physical contact, read letters inside sealed envelopes by merely placing them on the psychometrist's forehad and so on. His work was promoted further by the geologist William Denton.

Psychologist Joseph Jastrow criticized Buchanan's work on psychometry as based on delusion and wishful thinking.

Buchanan became the chair of "Physiology and the Institutes of Medicine" at the Eclectic Medical Institute in Cincinnati, Ohio. He maintained this position from 1851 to 1856 and became dean of the faculty. Buchanan published for five years "Buchanan's Journal of Man", a publication based on his anthropology. He also wrote the book "Primitive Christianity".

In 1857, Buchanan returned to Louisville and became engaged with politics. From 1863 to 1866, Buchanan was chairman of the Democratic State Central Committee.

== Personal life ==
Buchanan married three times. He married Anne Rowan, daughter of John Rowan, in December 1841. Buchanan died on December 26, 1899, in San Jose, California. He was interred in Cincinnati.

== Publications ==
- Manual of Psychometry: The Dawn of a New Civilization (1893)
- Periodicity: The Absolute Law of the Entire Universe (1897)
