= Hargrave Jennings =

British occult writer (1817–1890)

Hargrave Jennings (1817–1890) was a British Freemason, Rosicrucian, author on occultism and esotericism, and amateur student of comparative religion.

Jennings was a member of the Societas Rosicruciana in Anglia and was involved with a Pagan group inspired by The Golden Ass.

== Phallism and phallicism ==
In several voluminous works, Jennings developed the theory that the origin of all religion is to be sought in phallic worship of the Sun and fire, which he described as "phallism."

In addition to the works to which he affixed his own name, Jennings is thought by some researchers to have written a number of anonymous volumes in the privately printed "Nature Worship and Mystical Series" series, and possibly also to have written under the pseudonym "Sha Rocco."

As Jennings made clear in several of his books, he used the word "phallic" in its non-gendered sense, meaning "having to do with the sexual organs"; thus he included worship of the female genitalia under the heading of "phallic." In later editions he reluctantly acceded to popular (although incorrect) usage and called his subject "phallicism."

== Disagreements with Blavatsky ==
Madame Blavatsky disagreed with Jennings' thesis of phallicism being the origin of all religion.

Blavatsky writes,

It is quite true that the origin of every religion is based on the dual powers, male and female, of abstract Nature, but these in their turn were the radiations or emanations of the sexless, infinite, absolute Principle, the only One to be worshipped in spirit and not with rites; whose immutable laws no words of prayer or propitiation can change, and whose sunny or shadowy, beneficent or maleficent influence, grace or curse, under the form of Karma, can be determined only by the actions--not by the empty supplications--of the devotee. This was the religion, the One Faith of the whole of primitive humanity.

She suggests her own thesis of the birth of phallicism. However she also praised highly his earlier book The Rosicrucians, as well as paying him due credit with such quotes as:

How well Hargrave Jennings expresses himself when speaking of Pyramids, and how true are his words when he asks: "Is it at all reasonable to conclude, at a period when knowledge was at the highest, and when the human powers were, in comparison with ours at the present time, prodigious, that all these indomitable, scarcely believable physical effects — that such achievements as those of the Egyptians — were devoted to a mistake? that the myriads of the Nile were fools laboring in the dark, and that all the magic of their great men was forgery, and that we, in despising that which we call their superstition and wasted power, are alone the wise? No! there is much more in these old religions than probably — in the audacity of modern denial, in the confidence of these superficial-science times, and in the derision of these days without faith — is in the least degree supposed. We do not understand the old time.

== Works ==
- Indian Religions, or Results of the Mysterious Buddhism (1858)
- Curious Things of the Outside World: Last Fire (1861)
- The Rosicrucians: Their Rites and Mysteries (1870)
- Live Lights and Dead Lights (1873), One of the Thirty, a Strange History (1873)
- The Obelisk: Notices of the Origin, Purpose and History of Obelisks (1877)
- Childishness and Brutality of the Time (1883)
- Phallicism, Celestial and Terrestrial, Heathen and Christian (1884)
- Charon: Sermons from the Styx: a Posthumous Work by Frederick the Great (1886)
- Phallic Objects, Monuments and Remains (1889)

=== As Sha Rocco ===
- The Masculine Cross and Ancient Sex Worship 1874; reprinted in the Nature Worship and Mystical Series 1890
- Sex Mythology 1898 (This was published after Jennings' death, but may be a reprint of earlier writings.)

=== Anonymous "Nature Worship and Mystical Series" ===
- Phallic Worship (1880)
- Phallism: A Description of the Worship of Lingam-Yoni (1889) Reprinted as Phallicism (ca. 1890-91)
- Ophiolatreia: An Account of the Rites and Mysteries Connected with the Origin, Rise, and Development of Serpent Worship (1889)
- Phallic Objects, Monuments, and Remains (1889)
- Cultus Arborum: A Descriptive Account of Phallic Tree Worship (1890)
- Fishes, Flowers, and Fire as Elements and Deities in the Phallic Faiths and Worship (1890)
- Archaic Rock Inscriptions: an Account of the Cup and Ring Marking (1890)
- Nature Worship: An Account of Phallic Faiths and Practices (1891)
- Phallic Miscellanies: Facts and Phases of Ancient and Modern Sex Worship, as Explained Chiefly in the Religions of India (1891)
- Mysteries of the Rosie Cross, or the History of that Curious Sect of the Middle Ages, known as the Rosicrucians (1891)
