= Tree of knowledge system =

Map of history from Big Bang to present

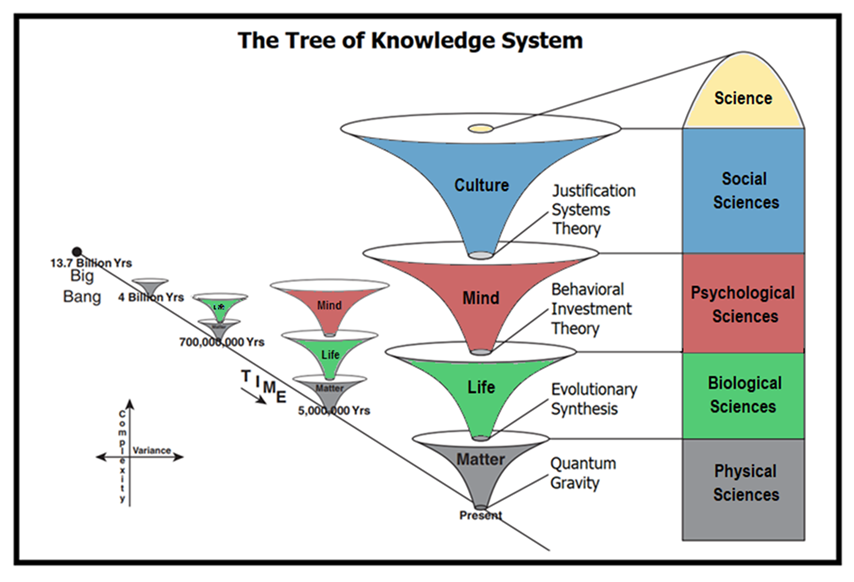
Gregg Henriques' Tree of Knowledge System

The tree of knowledge (ToK) system is a new map of Big History that traces cosmic evolution across four different planes of existence, identified as Matter, Life, Mind and Culture that are mapped respectively by the physical, biological, psychological and social domains of science. The Tree of Knowledge (ToK) System was developed by Gregg Henriques, who is a professor and core faculty member in the Combined-Integrated Doctoral Program in Clinical and School Psychology at James Madison University. The ToK System is part of a larger Unified Theory of Knowledge that Henriques describes as a consilient scientific humanistic philosophy for the 21st Century. The official Unified Theory of Knowledge website describes the ToK System as:

[A] theory of scientific knowledge that defines the human knower in relation to the known. It achieves this novel accomplishment by solving the problem of psychology and giving rise to a truly consilient view of the scientific landscape. It accomplishes this via dividing the evolution of behavioral complexity into four different planes of existence...The ToK also characterizes modern empirical natural science as a kind of justification system that functions to map complexity and change.

The outline of the ToK System was first published in 2003 in Review of General Psychology. Two special issues of the Journal of Clinical Psychology in December 2004 and January 2005 were devoted to the elaboration and evaluation of the model. In 2008, a special issue of Theory & Psychology was devoted to the ToK System. In 2011, Henriques published A New Unified Theory of Psychology. That same year he also launched the blog Theory of Knowledge: A Unified Approach to Psychology and Philosophy on Psychology Today, which remains active. There is also a Theory Of Knowledge Society and discussion listserve that is devoted to discussing Henriques' work and other big picture viewpoints.

In some ways, the ToK System reflects a fairly common hierarchy of nature and of the sciences that has been represented in one way or another since the time of Auguste Comte, who in the 19th century used a hierarchical conception of nature to argue for the existence of sociology. It also has clear parallels with Aristotle's conception of the scales of nature and the first four levels of the Great Chain of Being.

Despite some overlap with a number of traditional schemes, the ToK System is properly thought of as a new theory of both ontic reality and our scientific knowledge of that reality. One of the most important and salient features of the Tree of Knowledge is how it represents reality as consisting of four different planes of existence. The theory is that, following Matter, Life, Mind and Culture each represent complex adaptive landscapes that are organized and mediated by novel emergent information processing and communication systems. Specifically, DNA/RNA store information that is processed by cells which then engage in intercellular communication to create the plane of existence called Life. Similarly, the brain and nervous system store and process information in animals which then engage in communication networks on the complex adaptive plane called Mind. Finally, linguistic storage and processing and communication between human beings generates the emergence of the Culture-Person plane of existence.

The separable planes of existence or dimension of complexity argument is one of the most crucial aspects of the system. Many have argued nature is hierarchically leveled; for example, a list of such levels might be subatomic particles, atoms, molecules, cells, organ structures, multi-celled organisms, consciousness, and society is common. The ToK System embraces a view of nature as levels, but adds the notion that there are also separable dimensions of complexity. The difference becomes particularly clear in the extension of the ToK System into the Periodic Table of Behavior. The Periodic Table of Behavior (PTB) shows that natural science can be arranged in terms of the four fundamental dimensions (i.e., matter, life, mind, and culture) and three fundamental levels of analysis (i.e., part, whole, group). The PTB also demonstrates that behavior is a central concept in science. Epistemologically, natural scientists view the world via a third person behavioral lens. Ontologically, science is about mapping different kinds of behaviors that take place in nature at various levels and dimensions of analysis.

The second central insight of the ToK System is that it shows how natural science is a particular kind of justification system that emerges out of Culture based on novel methods and specific epistemological commitments and assumptions (i.e., an exterior view point, quantification and experimentation). This epistemology and methodology functions to justify scientific ontology, which in turn maps the ontic reality. Specifically, the domains of the physical, biological, (basic) psychological and social sciences map the ontic dimensions of matter, life, mind and culture. The Periodic Table of Behavior further shows how science is a justification system that is arranged to map behavioral frequencies at different dimensions of complexity and levels of analysis.

== Dimensions and planes of existence ==
=== Matter/Object — Physical sciences ===
The dimension of matter refers to the set of material objects and their behaviors through time. In accordance with modern cosmology, matter is theorized to have emerged from a pure energy singularity at the Big Bang. Space and time were also born at such a point. Nonliving material objects range in complexity from subatomic particles to large organic molecules. The physical sciences (i.e., physics, chemistry, geology, astronomy) describe the behavior of material objects.

=== Life/Organism — Biological sciences ===
The dimension of life refers to organisms and their behaviors through time. Living objects are considered a unique subset of material objects. Just as quantum particles form the fundamental units of material complexity, genes are the fundamental units of living information. Although many questions about the emergence of life remain unanswered, in accordance with modern biology, the ToK posits that natural selection operating on genetic combinations through time is the unified theory of biology and forms the foundational understanding for the emergence of organic complexity.

=== Mind/Animal — (Basic) psychological sciences ===
Mind/cognition in the ToK system refers to the set of mental behaviors. Mental behaviors are behaviors of animals mediated by the nervous system that produce a functional effect on the animal-environment relationship. As such, Mind/cognition is essentially synonymous with what behavioral psychologists have meant when they use the term behavior. Thus, a fly avoiding a fly swatter, a rat pushing a bar or a human getting a drink of water are all mental behaviors. Mind is not synonymous with sentience or the capacity for mental experience, although such processes are presumed to emerge in the mental/cognitive dimension. Cognition, in the broad sense of the term is meaning bodily-neuro-social information processing, as in EEEE Cognition: Embodied, Embedded, Enactive, Extended. While cognitive science stands for naturalist study of mind, psychology is an approach grounded in the tradition of humanities, especially philosophy. Thus, by defining mind as mental behavior, Henriques argues that the ToK System provides a way to bridge the epistemological differences between cognitive and behavioral science. Henriques argues that comparative psychology, ethology, and (animal) cognitive behavioral neuroscience should all be thought of as parts of the discipline that maps the animal-mental domain.

=== Culture/Person — Human social sciences ===
Culture in the ToK system refers to the set of sociolinguistic behaviors, which range from large scale nation states to individual human justifications for particular actions. Just as genetic information processing is associated with the Life dimension and neuronal information processing associated with the Mind dimension, symbolic information processing emerges with the Cultural dimension. Henriques argues that human cognitive science, human psychology and the social sciences (i.e., anthropology, sociology, political science, and economics) work to map this domain.

== Theoretical joint points ==
=== The modern synthesis ===
The modern synthesis refers to the merger of genetics with natural selection which occurred in the 1930s and 1940s and offers a reasonably complete framework for understanding the emergence of biological complexity. Although there remain significant gaps in biological knowledge surrounding questions such as the origin of life and the emergence of sexual reproduction, the modern synthesis represents the most complete and well-substantiated joint point.

=== Behavioral investment theory ===
Behavioral investment theory (BIT) is a metatheoretical formulation for the mind, brain and animal behavioral sciences. Henriques proposes that it enables the merger of the selection science of behaviorism with the information science of cognitive neuroscience that has conceptual parallels with the modern synthesis. BIT posits that the nervous system evolved as an increasingly flexible computational control system that coordinates the behavioral expenditure of energy of the animal as a whole. Expenditure of behavioral energy is theorized to be computed on an investment value system built evolutionarily through natural selection operating on genetic combinations and ontogenetically through behavioral selection operating on neural combinations. As such, the current behavioral investments of the animal are conceptualized as the joint product of the two vectors of phylogeny and ontogeny. A unique element of BIT is that it finds a core of agreement and builds bridges between five brain-behavior paradigms: (1) cognitive science; (2) behavioral science; (3) evolutionary theory and genetics; (4) neuroscience; and (5) cybernetics/systems theory.

David C. Geary noted the similarities between his "motive-to-control" hypothesis and Henriques' Behavioral Investment Theory, which were developed independently of each other. Furthermore, Geary suggested that his model "seem[ed] to fill in many of the proximate mechanisms and evolutionary pressures that define the life-mind joint point, and provided a framework for further development of the mind-culture joint point."

=== Justification systems theory ===
The justification systems theory (JUST; formerly known as the justification hypothesis) posits that the evolution of language reached a tipping point with emergence of propositional claims. Specifically, propositional claims can be questioned, which generates the "question-answer" dynamic. This creates the problem of justification, which Henriques argues drives both the design of the human self-consciousness system as a mental organ of justification and gives rise to the evolution of the Culture-Person plane of existence. JUST is a novel proposal that allows for both the understanding of the evolution of culture and for identifying what makes humans distinct animals. A basic initial claim of JUST is that the process of justification is a crucial component of human mental behavior at both the individual and societal level. Unlike all other animals, humans everywhere ask for and give explanations for their actions. Arguments, debates, moral dictates, rationalizations, and excuses all involve the process of explaining why one's claims, thoughts or actions are warranted. In virtually every form of social exchange, from warfare to politics to family struggles to science, humans are constantly justifying their behavioral investments to themselves and others.

JUST consists of three key postulates:

- The first is that the evolution of propositional language must have created the problem of justification, which involves three interlocking problems of deciphering what is (1) analytically true and what is (2) good for the group and (3) good for the individual.
- The second postulate is that the structure and functional design of human consciousness can be understood as a solution to the problem of justification. Specifically, the three domains of human consciousness that Henriques identifies in the Updated Tripartite Model of the (1) experiential; (2) private narrator; and (3) public narrator are directly consistent with adaptive pressures that arise from the logic of the problem of justification. This analysis deepens when one considers the dynamic relationships and filtering that takes place between these three domains.
- The third postulate is that culture can be understood as large scale justification systems that coordinate the behavior of human populations. Cultural systems are seen to evolve much in the same way as organisms do in biological evolution: there is a process of variation, selection and retention of belief systems.

== The "problem of psychology" ==
The ToK System emerged as a consequence of Henriques wrestling with what he calls "the problem of psychology". Henriques argues that the most difficult problem in psychology as a discipline is that while there is incredible diversity offered by different approaches to psychology, and there is no consensus model of what psychology actually is. Specifically, Henriques argues that the field lacks a clear definition, an agreed upon subject matter, and a coherent conceptual framework. The problem has been long standing, identified as the "crisis" by Lev Vygotsky in the mid 1920s.

Henriques further argues that the patent tendency of psychology has been toward theoretical and substantial fragmentation and increasing insularity among the "specialties." In other words, the discipline has fragmented into different schools of thought and methodology, with no overall framework to interpret and integrate the research of different areas. At its best, the different approaches are a strength of psychology; different approaches lead to novel ideas, and prevent psychologists from clinging to a paradigm that fails to explain a phenomenon. At its worst, adherents of one particular school cling to their beliefs concerning the relative importance of their research and disregard or are ignorant of different approaches. In most cases, individual psychologists have to determine for themselves which elements of which perspective to apply, and how to integrate them into their overall understanding.

Henriques argues that the problem of psychology is a central feature of modern knowledge systems. In A New Unified Theory of Psychology, he described it as follows:

The problem of psychology is the joint observation that the field cannot be coherently defined and yet it connects more deeply than any other discipline to the three great branches of learning. Taken together, these observations suggest that the problem of psychology is a profound problem in academia at large. This conclusion is bolstered by the fact that as psychology has lumbered along acquiring findings but not foundational clarity, the fragmentation of human knowledge has grown exponentially. All of this suggests that the question, "What is psychology?" is profoundly important, one of the central questions in all of philosophy. Asking the right questions is often the most important step in getting the right answer. My interest in psychotherapy integration ultimately led me to ask the question, "What is psychology?”. Although I had no idea at the time, it turns out that this is the right question. And, as startling as it sounds, because psychology connects to so many different domains, the correct answer to it opens up a whole new vision for integrating human knowledge.

The reason for psychology's fragmentation, according to the ToK System, is that there has been no meta-theoretical frame that allows scholars to agree on the basic questions that need to be addressed. As such, the different schools of thought in psychology are like the blind men who each grab a part of the elephant and proclaim they have discovered its true nature. With its novel depiction of evolving dimensions of complexity, the ToK allows scholars finally to see the elephant. In his 2003 Review of General Psychology paper, Henriques used the ToK System with the attempt to clarify and align the views of B.F. Skinner and Sigmund Freud. These luminaries were chosen because when one considers their influence and historical opposition, it can readily be argued that they represent two schools of thought that are the most difficult to integrate. Henriques used the meta-perspective offered by the ToK to argue how one can retain the key insights from each school of thought, identify errors and points of confusion, and integrate the insights into a coherent whole.

Cultural and personality psychologist, Michael Katzko, however critiques Henriques' position on "the problem of psychology":

There is a very good reason for skepticism regarding the repeated claims that the one unique problem of psychology, applicable across the entire discipline, has been identified and that the ToK System solves it. The reason is given by the detail with which alternatives have been worked out, be they historical studies of institutional development or critical commentaries on the rhetorical structure of psychology's literature.

=== Solution ===
The problem of psychology, according to the ToK, is its conceptual incoherence, which Henriques identifies by the following:

(1) There is no agreed upon definition.
(2) There is no agreed upon subject matter.
(3) There is a proliferation of overlapping and redundant concepts.
(4) There are a large number of paradigms with fundamentally different epistemological assumptions.
(5) Specialization continues to be increasingly emphasized at the expense of generalization and thus the problem of fragmentation only grows.

When the various conceptions of psychology (e.g., behavioral, humanistic, cognitive) are viewed through the lens of the ToK System, psychology spans two different dimensions of complexity: the mental and the cultural. In other words, the discipline has historically spanned two fundamentally separate problems:

(1) the problem of animal behavior in general, and
(2) the problem of human behavior at the individual level.

If, as previously thought, nature simply consisted of levels of complexity, psychology would not be crisply defined in relationship to biology or the social sciences. And, indeed, it is frequently suggested that psychology exists in an amorphous space between biology and the social sciences. However, with its dimension of complexity depiction, the ToK System suggests that psychology can be crisply defined as the science of mind, which is the third dimension of complexity. Furthermore, because human behavior exists in the fourth dimension, psychology must be divided into two broad scientific domains of

(1) psychological formalism and
(2) human psychology.

Psychological formalism is defined as the science of mind and corresponds to the behavior of animal objects. Human psychology is considered to be a unique subset of psychological formalism that deals with human behavior at the level of the individual. Because human behavior is immersed in the larger socio-cultural context (level four in the ToK System), human psychology is considered a hybrid discipline that merges the pure science of psychology with the social sciences. It is important to point out that there are other disciplines the ToK System would classify as “hybrids.” Molecular genetics, for example, is a hybrid between chemistry and biology and neuroscience is a hybrid between biology and psychology. As with Henriques' proposed conception of human psychology, both of these disciplines adopt an object level perspective (molecular and cellular, respectively) on phenomena that simultaneously exist as part of meta-level system processes (life and mind, respectively).

Though David A. F. Haaga "congratulate[d] Dr. Henriques' ambitious, scholarly, provocative paper", and "found the Tree of Knowledge taxonomy, the theoretical joint points, the evolutionary history, and the levels of emergent properties highly illuminating", he asks the rhetorical questions,

If it is so difficult to define terms such as 'psychology' with such precision, why bother? Why not just agree that we all have at least a rough idea of what psychology is, and take the rest of the afternoon off? After all, if theoretical or empirical work improves our understanding of some aspect of the world or our fellow people, or improves our ability to help people enhance their physical or emotional well being, what difference does it make whether this work is considered a part of psychology, of cognitive science, of behavioral neuroscience, of public health, or what have you? This raises the question of what definitions in general are good for.

In a similar vein, Scott O. Lilienfeld, who described Henriques' effort as "thoughtful", contended that psychology is "an inherently fuzzy concept that resists precise definition" and that "attempts to define psychology [would be] likely to hamper rather than foster consilience across disciplines". Lilienfield went on further to suggest that the scientist-practitioner gap in psychology lies not in definitional issues, but in different "epistemic attitudes" between these two groups. He stated that scientists have an epistemic attitude of empiricism, (where questions regarding human nature are settled by scientific evidence), and that practitioners have an epistemic attitude of romanticism, (where questions of human nature are settled by intuition). Lilienfeld suggested that the solution to the scientist-practitioner gulf isn't definitional, but in "train[ing] future clinical scientists to appreciate the proper places of romanticism and empiricism within science".

== Consciousness and human behavior ==
A frequent question and point of confusion in the ToK System is the definition and meaning of consciousness. As mentioned above, mind is not synonymous with consciousness. And, to understand consciousness from a ToK vantage point, it is crucial to recognize that the term is often ambiguous in its meaning. Two primary meanings are sentience, which is the capacity for mental experience and self-awareness, which is the capacity to be aware of one's awareness. Sentience is conceptualized as a "level 3" phenomenon, possessed by many animals other than humans and is defined as a "perceived" electro-neuro-chemical representation of animal-environment relations. The ingredient of neurological behavior that allows for the emergence of mental experience is considered the "hard" problem of consciousness and the ToK System does not address this question explicitly. In contrast, through the Justification Hypothesis (see below), the ToK System involves a very direct analysis of the other issue of consciousness, that of self-awareness.

Another frequent question that is raised is "Where does individual human behavior fall on the ToK?" To analyze human behavior from the context of the ToK, one uses the ToK like a prism to separate the dimensions of behavior into physiochemical, biogenetic, neuropsychological and sociolinguistic. Thus if we imagine a conversation between a husband and wife as follows:

Wife: “You are late again.”
Husband: “Please, not now. It was a stressful day, traffic was bad, and you know that if work needs to be done, I can’t just leave it.”

The words represent the sociolinguistic dimension and are understood as a function of justification. Justification systems are seen both at the level of individual, micro-social and societal (i.e., the context of justification in which men work and women stay at home). The actions of the husband and wife in terms of facial expression, body movement, etc. are seen as the mental dimension and are understood as a function of behavioral investment. The physiological make up of the organ systems and cells of each body is seen as the biogenetic dimension. Finally, the position, temperature, molecular make up is seen as the physiochemical dimension. Each of the more basic dimensions represent conditions of possibility that allow for the emergence of the higher dimension of process. Thus, insufficient oxygen disrupts organic processes which in turn renders neuropsychological and sociolinguistic processes impossible.

== Toward the integration of human knowledge ==
As stated above, the ToK System proposes a new epistemology with the goal of moving academic knowledge toward what E.O. Wilson termed consilience. Consilience is the interlocking of fact and theory into a coherent, holistic view of knowledge. Henriques argues that the ToK affords new perspectives on how knowledge is obtained because it depicts how science emerges from culture and that the four dimensions of complexity correspond to four broad classes of science: the physical, biological, psychological and social sciences.

Henriques further argues that developing such a system for integrating knowledge is not just an academic enterprise. He suggests that in an increasingly complex world, the fragmented state of knowledge can be seen as one of the most pressing social problems of our time. Henriques also believes that history seems to attest that the absence of a collective worldview ostensibly condemns humanity to an endless series of conflicts that inevitably stem from incompatible, partially correct, locally situated justification systems. Thus, from Henriques' perspective, there are good reasons for believing that if there was a shared, general background of explanation, humanity might be able to achieve much greater levels of harmonious relations.

In a 2008 article on the ToK, Henriques cites Oliver Reiser's 1958 call for unifying scientific knowledge that Henriques implies is similar in theme to the ToK:

In this time of divisive tendencies within and between the nations, races, religions, sciences and humanities, synthesis must become the great magnet which orients us all…[Yet] scientists have not done what is possible toward integrating bodies of knowledge created by science into a unified interpretation of man, his place in nature, and his potentialities for creating the good society. Instead, they are entombing us in dark and meaningless catacombs of learning.

With its depiction of the dimensions of complexity and interlocking theoretical joint points, Henriques' believes that his ToK System offers new avenues that might allow scholars to meet Reiser’s call for academic synthesis. Henriques, like Reiser, believes that with a shared sense of purpose and a common background of explanation, people might yet be able to integrate bodies of knowledge into a unified interpretation of humanity, with humanity's place in nature and its potentialities for creating the good society.

== See also ==
- Tree of knowledge (philosophy) by René Descartes
- Tinbergen's four questions
- Behavioral repertoire
- Consilience
  - Consilience: The Unity of Knowledge – 1998 book by E.O. Wilson
- Descriptive psychology
- General System Theory
- Psychological behaviorism
- Social meaning-making
- The Two Cultures and the Scientific Revolution – 1959 book by C. P. Snow
- Unified theory of cognition
- Unity of science
- Metasystem transition

== Bibliography ==
- Anchin, J.C. (2008). The critical role of the dialectic in viable metatheory: A commentary on Henriques' Tree of Knowledge System for integrating human knowledge. Theory & Psychology, 18, 801–816. Full text
- Calhoun, L.G. (2004). The unification of psychology: A noble quest. Journal of Clinical Psychology, 60, 1283–1289. Abstract
- Geary, D. C. (2005). The motivation to control and the origin of mind: Exploring the life-mind joint point in the tree of knowledge. Journal of Clinical Psychology, 61, 21–46. Full text
- Gilbert, P. (2004). A much needed macro level view: A commentary on Henriques’ psychology defined. Journal of Clinical Psychology, 60, 1223–1226. Full text
- Goertzen, J.R. (2008). On the possibility of unification: The reality and nature of the crisis in psychology. Theory & Psychology, 18, 829–852. Full text
- Haaga, D.A.F. (2004). Defining psychology: What can it do for us? Journal of Clinical Psychology, 60, 1227–1230. Full text
- Hayes, S.C. (2004). Taxonomy as a contextualist views it. Journal of Clinical Psychology, 60, 1231–1236. Full text
- Henriques, G.R. (2008). The problem of psychology and the integration of human knowledge: Contrasting Wilson's Consilience with the Tree of Knowledge System. Theory & Psychology, 18, 731–755. Full text
- Henriques, G.R. (2005). A new vision for the field: Introduction to the second special issue on the unified theory. Journal of Clinical Psychology, 61, 3–6. Full text
- Henriques, G.R. (2005). Toward a useful mass movement. Journal of Clinical Psychology, 61, 121–139. Full text
- Henriques, G.R. (2004). Psychology Defined. Journal of Clinical Psychology, 60, 1207–1221. Full text Archived 10 June 2010 at the Wayback Machine
- Henriques, G.R. (2004). The development of the unified theory and the future of psychotherapy. Psychotherapy Bulletin, 39, 16–21. Final draft
- Henriques, G.R., & Cobb, H.C. (2004). Introduction to the special issues on the unified theory. Journal of Clinical Psychology, 60, 1203–1205. Full text
- Henriques, G.R., & Sternberg, R. J. (2004). Unified professional psychology: Implications for combined-integrated doctoral training programs. Journal of Clinical Psychology, 60, 1051–1063. Full text
- Henriques, G.R. (2003). The Tree of Knowledge System and the Theoretical Unification of Psychology. Review of General Psychology, 7, 150–182. Full text Archived 25 March 2009 at the Wayback Machine.
- Henriques, G.R. (2002). The harmful dysfunction analysis and the differentiation between mental disorder and disease. Scientific Review of Mental Health Practice, 1, 157–173. Full text
- Henriques, G.R. (2000). Depression: Disease or behavioral shutdown mechanism? Journal of Science and Health Policy, 1, 152–165. Full text
- Jones, R. (2005). From that dirty little science grows a Tree of Knowledge. The Madison, 1, 36–45. Full text
- Katzko, M.W. (2008). Pruning the Tree of Knowledge. Theory & Psychology, 18, 817–828. Full text
- Katzko, M.W. (2004). Psychology's dilemma: An institutional neurosis? Journal of Clinical Psychology, 60, 1237–1242. Full text
- Kihlstrom, J.F. (2004). Unity within psychology, and unity between science and practice. Journal of Clinical Psychology, 60, 1243–1247. Full text
- Lilienfeld, S.O. (2004). Defining psychology: Is it worth the trouble? Journal of Clinical Psychology, 60, 1249–1253. Full text
- Mayer, J.D. (2004). How does psychotherapy influence personality? A theoretical integration. Journal of Clinical Psychology, 60, 1291–1315. Full text
- Presbury, J. (2004). Rooting the tree of knowledge: A response to Henriques’ psychology defined. Journal of Clinical Psychology, 60, 1255–1258. Full text
- Quackenbush, S.W. (2008). Theoretical unification as a practical project: Kant and the Tree of Knowledge System. Theory & Psychology, 18, 757–777. Full text
- Quackenbush, S.W. (2005). Remythologizing culture: Narrativity, justification, and the politics of personalization. Journal of Clinical Psychology, 61, 67–80. Full text Archived 16 November 2013 at the Wayback Machine
- Rand, K.L., & Ilardi, S.S. (2005). Toward a consilient science of psychology. Journal of Clinical Psychology, 61, 7–20. Full text
- Shaffer, L.S. (2008). Religion as a large-scale justification system: Does the Justification Hypothesis explain animistic attribution? Theory & Psychology, 18, 779–799. Full text
- Shaffer, L.S. (2006). Durkheim's aphorism, the Justification Hypothesis, and the nature of social facts. Sociological Viewpoints, fall issue, 57–70. Full text
- Shaffer, L.S. (2005). From mirror self-recognition to the looking glass self: Exploring the justification hypothesis. Journal of Clinical Psychology, 61, 47–65 . Full text
- Shealy, C.N. (2005). Justifying the justification hypothesis: Scientific-humanism, Equilintegration (EI) Theory, and the Beliefs, Events, and Values Inventory (BEVI). Journal of Clinical Psychology, 61, 81–106. Full text
- Slife, B. (2005). Testing the limits of Henriques' proposal: Wittgensteinian lessons and hermeneutic dialogue. Journal of Clinical Psychology, 61, 107–120. Full text
- Stam, H.J. (2004). Unifying psychology: Epistemological act or disciplinary maneuver? Journal of Clinical Psychology, 60, 1259–1262. Full text
- Stanovich, K.E. (2004). Metarepresentation and the great cognitive divide: A commentary on Henriques' "Psychology Defined". Journal of Clinical Psychology, 60, 1263–1266. Full text
- Stricker, G. (2004). The unification of psychology and psychological organizations. Journal of Clinical Psychology, 60, 1267–1269. Full text
- Vazire, S., & Robins, R.W. (2004). Beyond the Justification Hypothesis: A Broader Theory of the Evolution of Self-Consciousness. Journal of Clinical Psychology, 60, 1271–1273. Full text
- Viney, W. (2004). Pluralism in the sciences is not easily dismissed. Journal of Clinical Psychology, 60, 1275–1278. Full text
- Yanchar, S.C. (2004). Some discontents with theoretical unification. Journal of Clinical Psychology, 60, 1279–1281. Full text
