= Cognitive ethology =

Field of science

Cognitive ethology is a branch of ethology concerned with the influence of conscious awareness and intention on the behaviour of an animal. Donald Griffin, a zoology professor in the United States, set up the foundations for researches in the cognitive awareness of animals within their habitats.

The fusion of cognitive science and classical ethology into cognitive ethology "emphasizes observing animals under more-or-less natural conditions, with the objective of understanding the evolution, adaptation (function), causation, and development of the species-specific behavioral repertoire" (Niko Tinbergen 1963).

According to Jamieson & Bekoff (1993), "Tinbergen's four questions about the evolution, adaptation, causation and development of behavior can be applied to the cognitive and mental abilities of animals." Allen & Bekoff (1997, chapter 5) attempt to show how cognitive ethology can take on the central questions of cognitive science, taking as their starting point the four questions described by Barbara Von Eckardt in her 1993 book What is Cognitive Science?, generalizing the four questions and adding a fifth. Kingstone, Smilek & Eastwood (2008) suggested that cognitive ethology should include human behavior. They proposed that researchers should firstly study how people behave in their natural, real world environments and then move to the lab. Anthropocentric claims for the ways non-human animals interact in their social and non-social worlds are often used to influence decisions on how the non-human animals can or should be used by humans.

== Relation to laboratory experimental psychology ==
Traditionally, cognitive ethologists have questioned research methods that isolate animals in unnatural surroundings and present them with a limited set of artificial stimuli, arguing that such techniques favor the study of artificial issues that are not relevant to an understanding of the natural behavior of animals. However, many modern researchers favor a judicious combination of field and laboratory methods.

== Relation to ethics ==
Bekoff, M and Allen, C (1997) "identify three major groups of people (among some of whose members there are blurred distinctions) with different views on cognitive ethology, namely, slayers, skeptics, and proponents." The latter seemingly convergent with animal rights thinking in seeing animal experience as worthy in itself.

Ethicist Peter Singer is an example of a "proponent" in this sense, as is biologist E. O. Wilson who coined the term biophilia to describe the basis of a direct moral cognition, that 'higher' animals would use to perceive moral implications in the environment directly.

== Three views ==
According to Marc Bekoff, there are three different views towards whether a science of cognitive ethology is even possible. Slayers deny any possibility of success in cognitive ethology, proponents keep an open mind about animal cognition and the utility of cognitive ethological investigation, and skeptics stand somewhere in between.

== See also ==
- Animal consciousness
- Anthropomorphism
- Psychological behaviorism
- Cognitive module
- Feral child
- Neuroanthropology

== Sources ==
- Philosophy of Cognitive Ethology, Colin Allen, Texas A&M University
- Cognitive ethology: slayers, skeptics and proponents
