= Stephen Pearl Andrews =

American anarchist (1812–1886)

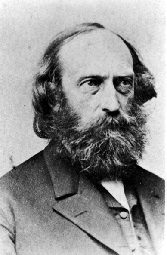
- Born: March 22, 1812; Templeton, Massachusetts, U.S.
- Died: May 21, 1886 (aged 74); New York City, U.S.
- Occupations: Activist, journalist, philosopher, writer
- Known for: American individualist anarchist and outspoken abolitionist

Stephen Pearl Andrews (March 22, 1812 – May 21, 1886) was an American libertarian socialist, individualist anarchist, linguist, political philosopher, and outspoken abolitionist.

== Life ==
Andrews was born on March 22, 1812 in Templeton, Massachusetts. His father, Elisha Andrews, was a Baptist clergyman and revivalist. He graduated from the Classics department at Amherst College. He studied law and was admitted to the state bar in 1833. He moved to New Orleans where he became a wealthy lawyer and slaveowner. He was converted by abolitionism and became an abolitionist leader.

He moved to Houston, Texas in 1839. He was a prominent advocate for abolitionism in the Republic of Texas and an active member of the Liberty Party. Andrews was mobbed for his abolitionist rhetoric in Texas, prompting him to leave the state in 1843 for England. In England, he sought funds to buy slaves in the United States in order to free them.

By the end of the 1840s, Andrews began to focus his energies on utopian communities. Fellow individualist anarchist Josiah Warren was responsible for Andrew's conversion to radical individualism and in 1851 they established Modern Times in Brentwood, New York. He was elected an Associate Fellow of the American Academy of Arts and Sciences in 1846. In 1857, Andrews established the Unitary Homes on East 14 St. and Stuyvesant St. in New York City.

Andrews was a supporter of the woman suffrage movement.

== Thought ==
In the 1870s, Andrews promoted Joseph Rodes Buchanan's psychometry besides his own universology predicting that a priori derived knowledge would supersede empirical science as exact science. Additionally, Andrews was considered a leader in the religious movement of spiritualism. Anarcho-syndicalist Rudolf Rocker called Andrews a significant exponent of libertarian socialism in the United States.

Andrews' individualist anarchism is a form of economic mutualism.

== Personal life ==
In 1835, he married Mary Ann Gordon, with whom he had four children including a son, H. L. Andrews, who married the traveler and writer Lilian Leland. Andrews died at his son's residence in New York City on May 21, 1886.

== Works ==
- The Phonographic Reader: A Complete Course of Inductive Reading Lessons in Phonography (1846), with Augustus Boyle
- Cost the Limit of Price (1851)
- The true Constitution of Government in the Sovereignty of the Individual (1851)
- The Science of Society (1851)
- The Sovereignty of the Individual (1853)
- Discoveries in Chinese or the Symbolism of the Primitive Characters (1854)
- Principles of Nature, Original Physiocracy, the New Order of Government (1857)
- The Pantarchy (1871)
- The Primary Synopsis of Universology and Alwato: The New Scientific Universal Language (1871)
- The Basic Outline of Universology (1872)
- The Primary Grammar of Alwato (1877)
- The Labor Dollar (1881)
- Elements of Universology (1881)
- The New Civilization (1885)
