= Annie Denton Cridge =

British-born American spiritualist and political reformer

Annie Denton Cridge (1825–1875) was a UK-born American spiritualist, political reformer, lecturer, and writer. Cridge had great interest in women's rights, politics, and spiritualism. She helped produce a radical newspaper The Vanguard. The utopian feminist novel she wrote in 1870, Man's Rights, or how would you like it? Comprising dreams, is said to be the first utopian novel written by a woman. As well, she assisted in the high-profile literary and political work of several family members - her husband Alfred Cridge, her brother William Denton, and her son Alfred Denton Cridge.

== Biography ==
Annie Denton Cridge was born Annie Denton, in England in 1825. Her parents were Robert Denton (1797-1851) and Jane Dixon Denton (1791-1854). Among her siblings were William and Elizabeth (later Seybold). In 1848 she and brother William emigrated to the U.S. William and Annie were spiritualists.

In 1854 Annie married Alfred Cridge (1824-1902), himself an author, abolitionist, and political reformer. Alfred was also U.K.-born and shared Annie's interest in spiritualism. Shortly after their wedding he published the book Epitome of spirit-intercourse: a condensed view of spiritualism, in its scriptural, historical, actual and scientific aspects... According to back matter in the book, at the time of publication Cridge and her husband lived in St. John, New Brunswick where Annie advertised to produce "psychometric reading of character" for clients. During her life she applied her psychometric abilities to the study of geology to aid the studies of her brother William.

In the mid-nineteenth century, spiritualism was the best known religious group to recognize the equality of women. Ann Braude, in her book, Radical Spirits, defines spiritualism as "a new religious movement aimed at proving the immortality of the soul by establishing communication with the spirits of the dead… It provided an alternative to the established religious order. It held two attractions to thousands of Americans: rebellion against death and rebellion against authority".

Cridge and her husband moved back to the U.S., establishing themselves in Dayton, Ohio, then in Richmond, Indiana. At those places they, with her brother William Denton, published the radical newspaper The Vanguard. The Vanguard was dedicated to "spiritualism, positive reform, and progressive literature". It campaigned in the cause of abolition of slavery and gave consideration to social and economic conditions. The newspaper also extolled the virtues of agricultural communal living. The Vanguard gave space to “connection spaces” and news columns on “Reform Communities” to inform readers of established communes.

The Vanguard was published during the American crisis of faith that emerged in the nineteenth century in response to the break away from romanticism and the emergence of scientific developments.

Cridge underwent her own crisis of faith due to two incidents that transitioned her into the literary and political spheres. When Cridge was twenty-two, she rejected her Evangelical upbringing in England that had been in line with her parents' beliefs. This she described in a series of autobiographical articles titled "My Soul's Thraldom and Its Deliverance." A portion of the work was published in successive editions of The Vanguard. In the series, she said her parents' Methodist doctrines "made heaven into hell". In chapter six of her autobiography, she writes, "Religion! call it not by that name: 'tis the demon of misery. What else could blight the silvery laugh of youth, freeze the gushings of joy and chain the soul in everlasting night!". She strived to find her spiritual truth, holding fluctuating perceptions of the religious practices of the day.

Additionally, she underwent a life-changing occurrence in 1857. She gave birth to a baby boy, but he only survived a few months. After his death, it is recorded that Cridge "saw the spirits of her own dead parents above his couch, waiting to bear his sweet spirit away. She watched her baby's spirit withdraw from his body and assume a spiritual body, with the help of his [deceased] grandparents". She bore two other children as well, a daughter (later Mrs. W.H. Smith of Palo Alto) and a surviving son, Alfred Denton Cridge.

In 1859 she published a monthly magazine The Home Gen.

In 1861 the Cridges moved to Washington, D.C. where Alfred found work in the Secret Service then in the federal Inspector Division. They were active slavery abolitionists and political reformers. They moved to Pennsylvania where Annie and Alfred were exposed to the electoral reform ideas of Pennsylvania Senator Buckalew. Alfred later was a prominent campaigner for proportional representation and other political reforms.

In 1870 Cridge and the children moved to an alternative colony at Riverside, California, Alfred staying in Washington to make money for the family project of building a home at Riverside.

In 1870 her groundbreaking feminist utopian novel Man's Rights or how would you like it? Comprising Dreams was published in Woodhull's and Claflin's Weekly, a magazine co-founded by Victoria Woodhull (1838-1927). That magazine also published an account of four other of her dreams a short time later (3 September-19 November 1870). The novel Man's Rights was published in book form that same year by her brother's wife, Elizabeth Melissa Foote Denton, of Wellesley, Mass. (A large collection of Denton family papers is stored at the offices of the Wellesley Historical Society, Wellesley, Mass.)

Around 1875 Cridge and her husband Alfred co-wrote a 12-page pamphlet Women's Rights and how to obtain them. Annie Cridge died in 1875 at Riverside, working hard to produce food for the commune.

Her surviving son, Alfred Denton Cridge (1860-1922), wrote one of the earliest U.S. science fiction novels, Utopia; Or, the History of an Extinct Planet, Psychometrically Explained (1884). He went on to be a political reformer, pushing for the Henry George single tax and helping introduce referendum powers into the Oregon state constitution.

== Notable works ==
=== "Man's Rights; Or, How Would You Like It? Comprising Dreams" ===
Cridge's novel Man's Rights, a work of utopian science fiction and satire, was published in 1870. It is the first known feminist utopian novel written by a woman.

The text features nine dreams experienced by a first-person female narrator. In the first seven dreams she visits the planet Mars, finding a society where traditional sex roles and stereotypes are reversed (gender reversal). The narrator witnesses the oppression of the men on Mars and their struggle for equality. Although initially confined to the home and strictly controlled, they start working towards their liberation after technological advancements free them from some of their grueling domestic chores. In the last two dreams, the narrator visits a future United States, ruled by a woman president and with an equal balance of men and women in the House and Senate. Legislators have begun to stop fining and imprisoning female prostitutes, and it is now the male clients who get arrested and sent to reformatories. A large number of women have taken up farming, and the nation has a promising economic future. The narrator concludes by asking whether this dream might not, after all, be a prophecy?

=== Other notable works ===
Cridge also wrote a fictitious children's novel, titled The Crumb-Basket (1868). This book contains dozens of short stories, only a few pages each, in which she discusses science, religion, and feminism at a very basic level. She writes as a first-person narrator, asking the children about women's rights, children's rights, and spiritualism. One of her stories, titled,"To My Boy Friends," is directed toward young boys. She asks them:

Probably you have heard of women's rights. First, think of your merry sister and cousin, Lizzie or Emma, with their bright eyes and musical voices; and then tell me if you would not like them to be as happy and as free as you are when you are men and they women. Don't you think they ought to be educated as well as you; to earn as much money, and have the right to use it as their own? Don't you think they should assist in making the laws by which they are to be governed, or to say who shall go to Congress, as much as men?

Cridge also wrote autobiographical nonfiction such as "My Soul's Thraldom and Its Deliverance" (1856) (published as a serial in The Vanguard in 1858) and several other serial pieces, "Laws of Friendship," "A Story from Real Life," and obituaries about her son's death. Many of her articles can be read in the archived issues of Vanguard found at The International Association for the Preservation of Spiritualist and Occult Periodicals.

== Literary significance ==
=== Literary elements ===
In the spirit of the Victorian era, two literary elements Cridge used in her work are psychological realism and stream-of-consciousness. She writes through stream-of-consciousness in Man's Rights by writing a series of dreams in a first-person narrative, interrupted by her own thoughts within the dream, and also discusses her literal writing of the dream outside the narrative. For example, after inscribing her dream, she writes, "I awoke: it was all a dream. My husband stood at my bedside. "Annie, Annie!" he said. "Awake Annie! That new girl of yours is good for nothing. You will have to rise and attend to her, else I shall have no breakfast.... I arose: and, as my husband ate his breakfast, I pondered over my strange dream", relaying her stories through a realistic rather than romantic means. Her sense perceptions, conscious and unconscious thoughts intermingle, uninterrupted by a forced narration. Additionally, Cridge focuses on the motivations and internal thoughts of characters in Man's Rights and The Crumb-Basket. Psychological realism is, therefore, discovered in her story-telling method.

Cridge also practices several elements of modern writers: writing embedded in the present culture and creative-writer-as-critic. T. S. Eliot writes that creative writing should be aware of the present culture. All of Cridge's fiction and nonfiction debates the most current issues of the time, pushing her toward the modern and further away from romanticism. Additionally, a quality of Virginia Woolf's writing is used by Cridge, creative-writer as critic. While Cridge tells children's stories that are fictional, each story has a political message embedded in her story-telling language. She appeals to children, asking them how they feel about inequality between men and women, and criticizes traditional gender stereotypes of female domesticity and fragility and male oppression of emotion. In one of her stories, she tells women to "romp, shout and dance merrily; you have two hundred and nine muscles that must be exercised. Run, and shout too; for your lungs need full breath and pure air, as much as the flowers need the dews and sunshine" merging women's rights topics with descriptive language.

=== Literary precepts ===
The works of Annie Denton Cridge can be critically categorized with feminist writing both before and after her time. Cridge shares similarities with Christine de Pizan, a medieval creative writer who wrote a Utopian story, The Book of the City of Ladies. She wrote as a creative writer as critic, utilized satire, and interlaced religious belief into her work. Both Pizan and Cridge joined a male-dominated literary community and contributed to female Utopian literature. Lee Cullen Khanna, a feminist utopia critic, wrote that "utopias can be spiritual or religious in their effect" as they symbolize a changed society. Utopias by women "frequently mirror what women lacked and what women wanted at the time when the books were published". In their utopian societies, women writers typically focus on family, sexuality, and marriage and other intangible features of human existence.

However, Cridge was writing in the "feminine" phase between 1790 and 1880. Characteristically of feminist writers of the era, she denied her place as an "angel of the house," and joined Ann Radcliffe, Mary Shelley, and Jane Austen as writers of the novel. However, her writing was transitional, bridging the feminist and female phases. She was a less-progressive precursor to Mina Loy's Feminist Manifesto during the feminist era between 1880 and 1930. Their primary connection was a focus on marriage reform. Loy writes, "The value of man is assessed entirely according to his use or interest to the community, the value of woman depends entirely on chance, her success or in success in maneuvering a man into taking the life-long responsibility of her." Similarly, Cridge writes about degraded women whose only "business is to get married," and in her satiric Men's Rights, in which Victorian roles of men and women are reversed, a father tells his son that all he has to do is "learn to be a good housekeeper; for you will be married one day and have to attend to your children." Cridge asks herself "why are they in this pitiable condition?" presenting her stance on marriage through fiction rather than pure criticism.

Furthermore, Cridge was a precursor to Virginia Woolf of the female phase, from 1930 to today, as Woolf believed that masculine and feminine writing is inherently different. Cridge wrote "feminine" fiction rather than "masculine" journalism, and explored domestic, marriage, and single life for women in comparison to men -- all focuses of Woolf's interest. Also, Cridge and Woolf both wrote as creative-writers-as-critics and used the stream-of-consciousness technique.
