= Friedrich Sorge =

Early German communist political leader (1828–1906)

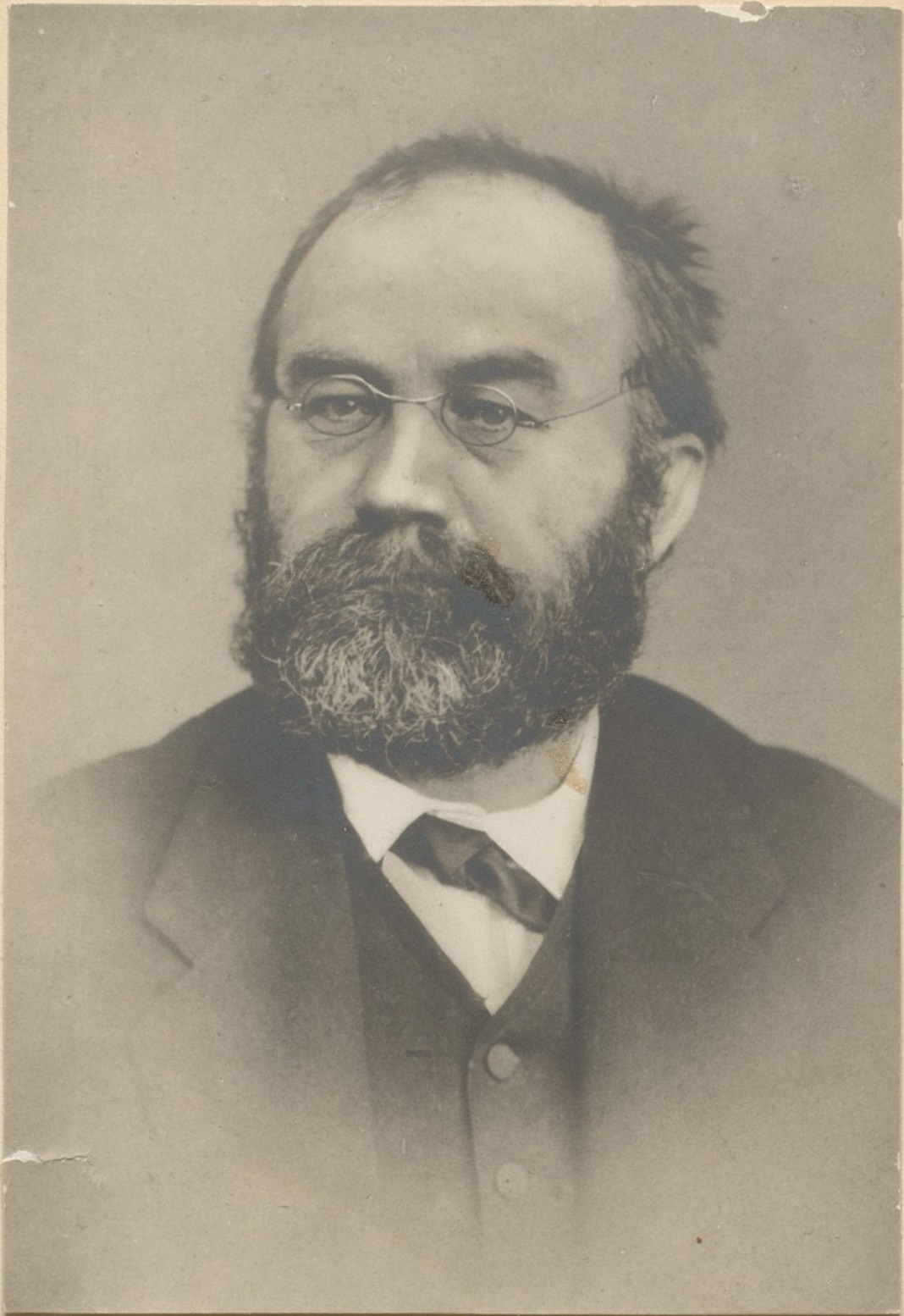
- Friedrich Adolph Sorge
- Born: 9 November 1828; Bethau, Province of Saxony, Prussia
- Died: 26 October 1906 (aged 77); Hoboken, New Jersey, United States
- Occupations: Music teacher, labor leader
- Relatives: Gustav Wilhelm Richard Sorge (nephew); Richard Sorge (great-nephew)

Friedrich Adolph Sorge (9 November 1828 – 26 October 1906) was a German communist political leader who emigrated to the United States, where he played an important role in the labor movement, including the foundation of the Socialist Labor Party of America.

== Early years ==
Friedrich Adolph Sorge was born on 9 November 1828 in Bethau, Kingdom of Prussia, son of the Reverend Georg Sorge and Hedwig Lange. His father was a free-thinking person, and often gave shelter to Polish revolutionaries travelling from France and Belgium to Poland. He was 19 when the revolutions of 1848 in the German states began. He joined a group of armed revolutionaries in Saxony, but they were quickly suppressed by Pomeranian troops and Sorge was forced to take refuge in Switzerland. He returned to Germany and joined the Karlsruhe Freikorps. His unit fought the Prussians in Baden and the Palatinate, losing both times. In June 1849 Sorge again took refuge in Switzerland.

Sorge was condemned to death in Germany for his role in the revolution. In 1851 he was expelled by the Swiss and moved to Belgium. In March 1852 he was expelled from Belgium and moved to London, where he caught cholera. After recovering he boarded a ship for New York, arriving in June 1852. He became a music teacher, married and settled in Hoboken, New Jersey. In 1857 he joined Albert Komp and Abraham Jacobi in forming the New York Communist Club, which was an educational society involved in the anti-slavery movement.

== Socialist leader ==
Sorge became an active socialist in 1865, after the end of the American Civil War, and soon became the leading proponent of Karl Marx's views in the United States. In December 1869 he founded Section I of New York of the International Workingmen's Association (IWMA, often called the First International), with 46 members. In December 1870 he established the Central Committee of the North American IWMA. In September 1871 Section I of the IWMA organized a demonstration of 20,000 workers, including black workers, demanding an eight-hour day and supporting the Paris Commune.

From 1872 to 1874 Sorge was general secretary of the First International's worldwide organization. His appointment followed the split between Marx and the anarchists led by Mikhail Bakunin, and a decision in September 1872 by the Hague Congress to transfer the IWA General Council to New York. While he was secretary, the IWMA continued to decline in both America and Europe.

In 1877 Sorge led a Marxist-oriented group in Newark that founded the Socialist Labor Party of America. Joseph Patrick McDonnell, editor of the New York Labor Standard gave significant assistance to Sorge. Sorge and McDonnell organized a textile strike in Paterson, New Jersey in 1878. The party, following a European Marxist line, did not succeed in gaining much support, since most workers looked to the mainstream political parties to support their goals. Sorge organized the International Labor Union of Hoboken in 1883.

== Later years ==
Sorge and Marx corresponded regularly from the 1860s until Marx died in 1883. Friedrich Engels visited Sorge in Hoboken in 1888, after Sorge had retired from politics. Sorge contributed articles to the German Marxist journal Die Neue Zeit from 1891 to 1895, discussing the history of socialism in the United States. According to Edward Aveling, Sorge was "one who was, perhaps, of all men the closest intimate in the later years of both Marx and Engels." Selig Perlman called him the father of modern socialism in America.

Sorge continued to teach music into his old age. He died on 26 October 1906 in Hoboken, New Jersey. The Soviet spy Richard Sorge was his grandnephew.

== Writings ==
- "Report of the North American Federal Council to the Hague Congress," (German section) in Documents of the First International: The Hague Congress...Minutes and Documents
- Labor Movement in the United States: A History of the American Working Class from Colonial Times to 1890, edited by Philip S. Foner and Brewster Chamberlin

== Sources ==
Citations

Sources

- "The First International in America (1864-1876)". Friedrich Sorge Biography (sec.).
  - Herreshoff, American Disciples of Marx, pp. 57–59, 70-71
  - Kai Schoenhals, "Introduction," Friedrich A. Sorge's Labor Movement in the United States: A History of the American Working Class from 1890 to 1896, pp ix-xi.
- Gaido, Daniel (2006-09-01). The Formative Period of American Capitalism: A Materialist Interpretation. Taylor & Francis. ISBN 978-0-203-96658-7.
- Hogarty, Richard A. (2001-01-01). Leon Abbett's New Jersey: The Emergence of the Modern Governor. American Philosophical Society. ISBN 978-0-87169-243-6.
- Marx, Karl; Engels, Friedrich; Lapides, Kenneth (1990-06-01). Marx and Engels on Trade Unions. International Publishers Co. ISBN 978-0-7178-0676-8.
- Mehring, Franz (2003-12-01). "Obituary of Friedrich Sorge". Historical Materialism. BRILL. ISBN 978-90-04-13606-9.
- Moreno, Barry (2004). "Sorge, Friedrich Adolf". Encyclopedia of New Jersey. Rutgers University Press. ISBN 978-0-8135-3325-4.
- Whymant, Robert (2007-01-09). Stalin's Spy: Richard Sorge and the Tokyo Espionage Ring. I.B.Tauris. ISBN 978-1-84511-310-0.
- "Herr Sorge saß mit zu Tisch – Porträt eines Spions". Spiegel Online. Vol. 24. 1951-06-13.

Political offices
Preceded by John Hales	General Secretary of the International Workingmen's Association; 1872–1874	Succeeded by Carl Speyer
