= Lumpen =

Lumpen can refer to:

- Lumpen (magazine), an American art and politics magazine
- Lumpen journal, a journal of poor and working class writing
- Lumpenproletariat, a term in Marxist sociology
- Lumpenbourgeoisie
- Swedish slang for military service, adopted by armed forces as a near-formal word
- LUMPENS, a South Korean visual art studio.
