= Band of the 10th of December =

French Bonapartist Secret society

The Band of the 10th of December was a secret Bonapartist society organized mainly from among lumpen proletariat, opportunists, and military leaders. The society helped progress Napoleon III's election as president of the Republic of France on December 10, 1848.

It is also known as "Society of December 10" and it is analyzed in great detail by Karl Marx in his essay The Eighteenth Brumaire of Louis Napoleon.
