= Albert Komp =

Albert Komp (born Johann Paul Albert Komp; 27 January 1845 – 4 April 1910) was a German-American painter who was active in New York City communist circles in the mid-nineteenth century.

Komp was born in 1845 in Prüm, Prussia, to Paul Komp and Anna Catharina Wilhelmine Hirfeld. He emigrated in 1864. He became a U.S. citizen in 1874 in Philadelphia, where he died in 1910.

In 1857, Komp joined Friedrich Sorge, Fritz Jacobi and Fr Kamm in setting up the New York Communist Club. He was a bank manager. He was also active in the American Workers League, alongside James McGuire and Ida B. Davis.

Komp was in correspondence with Karl Marx for a number of years, requesting literature such as The Poverty of Philosophy and the Neue Rheinische Zeitung be sent to him in New York.

Komp was a childhood friend of Joseph Dietzgen, and in 1861 Ditzgen left the manuscript of his article Schwarz oder Weiss with him when he left for Germany.
