= Lumpenbourgeoisie =

Colonial sociology term

Lumpenbourgeoisie is a term used in colonial sociology to describe members of the middle class and upper class (merchants, lawyers, industrialists, etc.) who have little collective self-awareness or economic base and who support the colonial masters. It is often attributed to Andre Gunder Frank in 1972, although the term is already present in several texts by Lukács (1943), Koestler (1945), C. Wright Mills (1951) and also in Paul Baran's The Political Economy of Growth (1957). Nonetheless, the term was popularized by Frank's book Lumpenbourgeoisie and Lumpendevelopment: Dependency, Class and Politics in Latin America (1972) which used it in its title.

A compound of the German word Lumpen (rags) and French word bourgeoisie, it follows Karl Marx's concept of the lumpenproletariat, a rejected underclass that sides readily with the elite bourgeoisie.

== In Latin America in the 1970s ==
The term is most often used in the context of Latin America. Frank writing on the origins of the term noted that he created this neologism, lumpenbourgeoisie, from lumpenproletariat and bourgeoisie. But although the colonial and neocolonial elites in Latin America were similar to European bourgeoisie on many levels, noted Frank, they had one major difference. This difference was in the former's mentality akin to that of the Marxist lumpenproletariat, the "refuse of all classes" (as described in Marx's The Eighteenth Brumaire of Louis Napoleon) who are easy to manipulate to support the capitalist system, often turning to crime. The colonial elites would—although not involved in crime activities—hurt the local economy by aiding the foreign exploiters. Foreign colonial powers want to acquire resources and goods found in the colonies, and they find this facilitated through the incorporation of the local elites into the system, as these latter become intermediaries between the rich colonial buyers and the poor local producers. The local elites then become increasingly reliant on the system in which they supervise the gathering of the surplus production from the colonies, taking their cut before the remaining goods are sold abroad. Frank termed this economic system lumpendevelopment and the countries affected by it lumpenstates.

== Prior usage ==
The term "lumpen-bourgeois" was used as early as 1906 by Bulgarian Marxist Dimitar Blagoev in his book "Contribution to the History of Socialism in Bulgaria". In Austria, the term "Lumpenbourgeoisie" had already been used in 1920 by Hungarian communist Béla Kun (using the pen name Blasius Kolozsváry). It can also be found in numerous other Austrian and German socialist publications from the 1920s. Joseph L. Love wrote that the term is misattributed to Frank and was in fact coined by C. Wright Mills in White Collar: The American Middle Classes (1951). However, in the 1940s, "lumpen bourgeoisie" – or "lumpen-bourgeoisie" – had already appeared in Lukács and Koestler.

In The Black Bourgeoisie (1957), which was translated from the original French text that was published in 1955, E. Franklin Frazier uses the term to describe African-American businessmen who cling to what he terms the "myth of Negro business" to affect meaningful change in racial politics. He was especially focused on the development of black-owned business that developed and expanded in both the U.S. South and North during the first decades of the 20th century.

== Later usage ==
An example of usage of the term after Frank is that by Czech philosopher Karel Kosík in 1997. In his article, Lumpenburžoazie a vyšší duchovní pravda ("Lumpenbourgeoisie and the higher spiritual truth"), Kosik defines "the lumpenbourgeoisie" as "a militant, openly anti-democratic enclave within a functioning, however half-hearted and thus helpless democracy".

== See also ==
- Comprador
- Dependency theory
- Kleptocracy
- Petite bourgeoisie
- Professional–managerial class
- Lumpenproletariat
- Labor aristocracy
