= 2 + 2 = 5 =

Mathematically incorrect slogan

Two Plus Two Make Five (1895), by Alphonse Allais, is a collection of absurdist short stories about anti-intellectualism as politics.

2 + 2 = 5 or two plus two equals five is a mathematical falsehood which is used as an example of a simple logical error that is obvious to anyone familiar with basic arithmetic.

The phrase has been used in various contexts since 1728, but is best known from the 1949 dystopian novel Nineteen Eighty-Four by George Orwell.

As a theme and as a subject in the arts, the anti-intellectual slogan 2 + 2 = 5 pre-dates Orwell and has produced literature, such as Deux et deux font cinq (Two and Two Make Five), a collection of absurdist short stories written in 1895 by Alphonse Allais, and the 1920 imagist art manifesto 2 × 2 = 5 by the poet Vadim Shershenevich.

== Self-evident truth and self-evident falsehood ==
In establishing the mundane reality of the self-evident truth of 2 + 2 = 4, in De Neutralibus et Mediis Libellus (1652) Johann Wigand said: "That twice two are four; a man may not lawfully make a doubt of it, because that manner of knowledge is grauen [graven] into mannes [man's] nature."

In the comedy-of-manners play Dom Juan, or The Feast with the Statue (1665), by Molière, the libertine protagonist, Dom Juan, is asked in what values he believes, and answers that he believes "two plus two equals four".

In the 18th century, the self-evident falsehood of 2 + 2 = 5 was attested in the Cyclopædia, or an Universal Dictionary of Arts and Sciences (1728), by Ephraim Chambers: "Thus, a Proposition would be absurd, that should affirm, that two and two make five; or that should deny 'em to make four." In 1779, Samuel Johnson likewise said that "You may have a reason why two and two should make five, but they will still make but four."

In the 19th century, in a personal letter to his future wife, Anabella Milbanke, Lord Byron said: "I know that two and two make four—& should be glad to prove it, too, if I could—though I must say if, by any sort of process, I could convert 2 & 2 into five, it would give me much greater pleasure."

In Gilbert and Sullivan's Princess Ida (1884), the Princess comments that "The narrow-minded pedant still believes/That two and two make four! Why, we can prove,/We women—household drudges as we are –/That two and two make five—or three—or seven;/Or five-and-twenty, if the case demands!"

== Politics, literature, propaganda ==
=== France ===
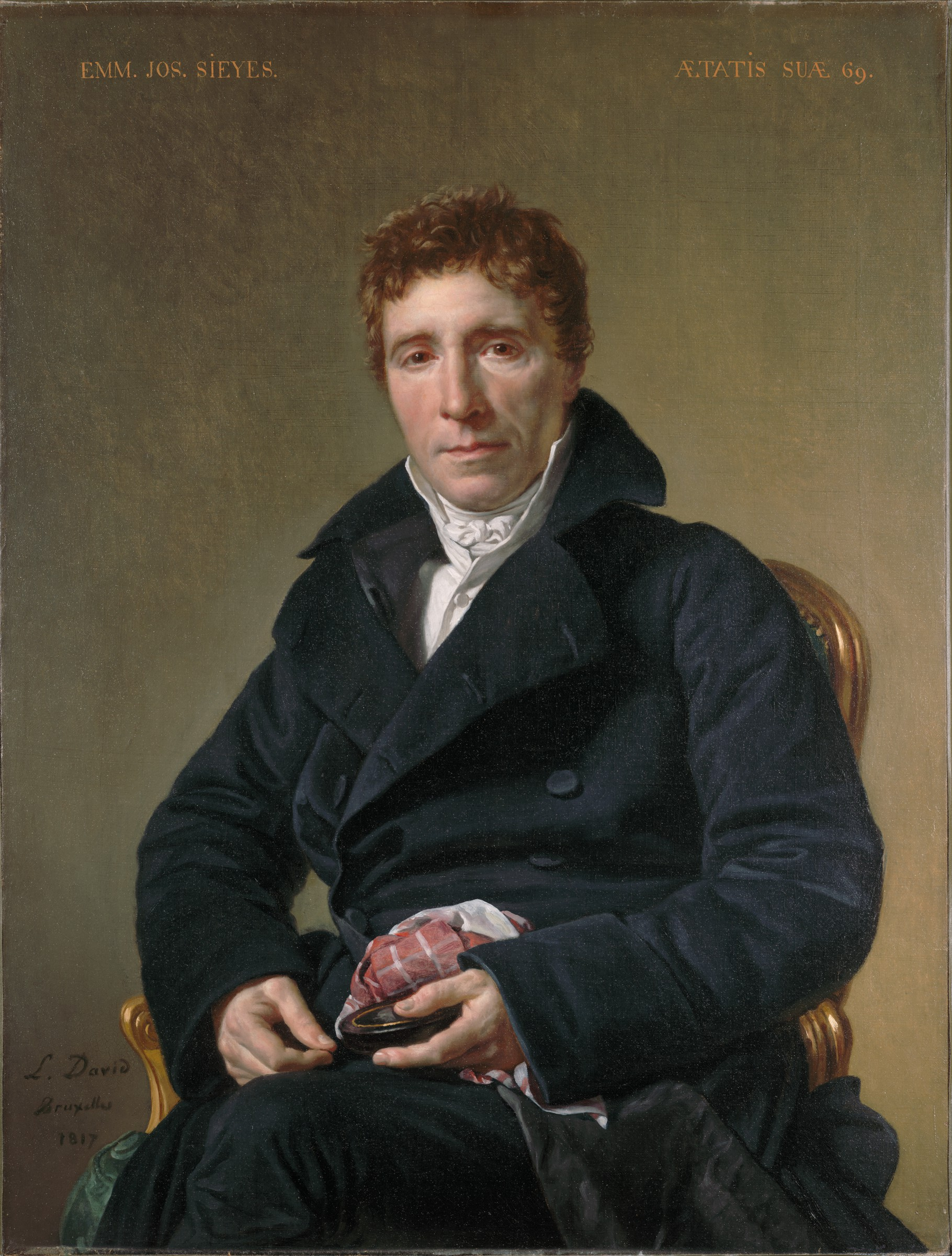
In the political pamphlet "What is the Third Estate?" (1789), Emmanuel-Joseph Sieyès provided the humanist bases for the French Revolution (1789–1799).

In the late 18th century, in the pamphlet What is the Third Estate? (1789), about the legalistic denial of political rights to the common-folk majority of France, Emmanuel-Joseph Sieyès, said: "Consequently, if it be claimed that, under the French constitution, 200,000 individuals, out of 26 million citizens, constitute two-thirds of the common will, only one comment is possible: It is a claim that two and two make five."

Using the illogic of "two and two make five", Sieyès mocked the demagoguery of the Estates-General for assigning disproportionate voting power to the political minorities of France—the Clergy (First Estate) and the French nobility (Second Estate)—in relation to the Third Estate, the numeric and political majority of the citizens of France.

In the 19th century, in the novel Séraphîta (1834), about the nature of androgyny, Honoré de Balzac said:

Thus, you will never find, in all Nature, two identical objects; in the natural order, therefore, two and two can never make four, for, to attain that result, we must combine units that are exactly alike, and you know that it is impossible to find two leaves alike on the same tree, or two identical individuals in the same species of tree. That axiom of your numeration, false in visible nature, is false likewise in the invisible universe of your abstractions, where the same variety is found in your ideas, which are the objects of the visible world extended by their interrelations; indeed, the differences are more striking there than elsewhere.

In the pamphlet "Napoléon le Petit" (1852), about the limitations of the Second French Empire (1852–1870), such as majority political support for the monarchist coup d'Ḗtat, which installed Napoleon III (r. 1852–1870), and the French peoples' discarding from national politics the liberal values that informed the anti-monarchist Revolution, Victor Hugo said: "Now, get seven million, five hundred thousand votes to declare that two-and-two-make-five, that the straight line is the longest road, that the whole is less than its part; get it declared by eight millions, by ten millions, by a hundred millions of votes, you will not have advanced a step."

In The Plague (1947), French philosopher Albert Camus declared that times came in history when those who dared to say that 2 + 2 = 4 rather than 2 + 2 = 5 were put to death.

=== Russia ===
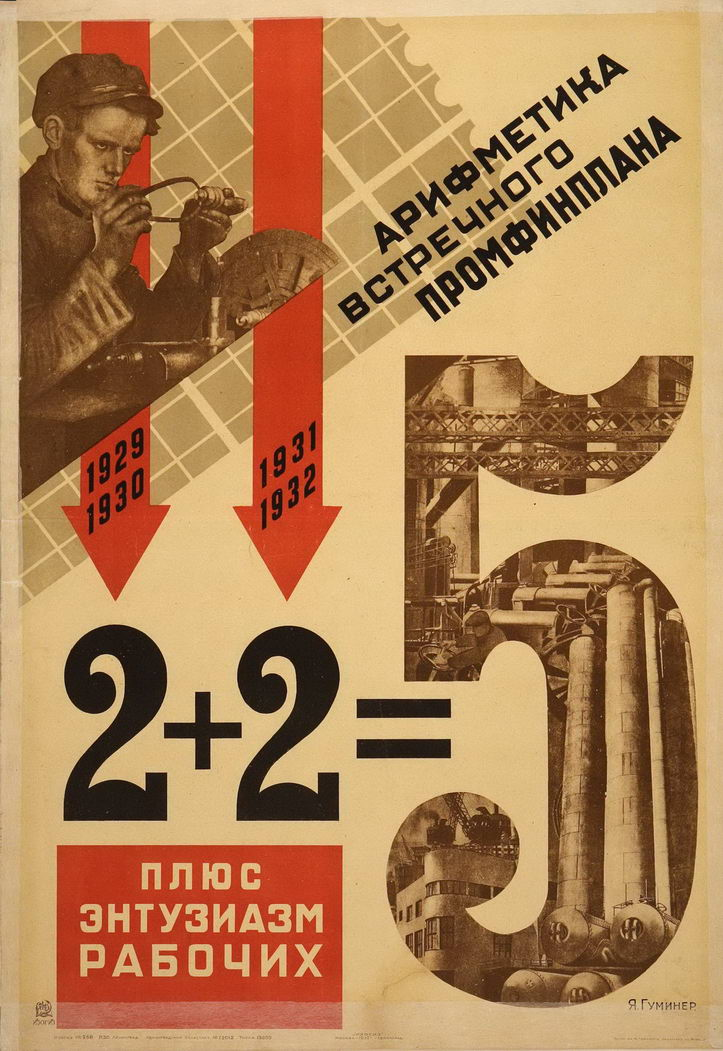
Soviet propaganda: The "Arithmetic of an Alternative Plan: 2 + 2 plus the Enthusiasm of the Workers = 5" exhorts the workers of the Soviet Union to realise five years of production in four years' time (Iakov Guminer, 1931).

In the late 19th century, the Russian press used the phrase 2 + 2 = 5 to describe the moral confusion of social decline at the turn of a century, because political violence characterised much of the ideological conflict among proponents of humanist democracy and defenders of tsarist autocracy in Russia. In The Reaction in Germany (1842), Mikhail Bakunin said that the political compromises of the French Positivists, at the start of the July Revolution (1830), confirmed their middle-of-the-road mediocrity: "The Left says, 2 times 2 are 4; the Right, 2 times 2 are 6; and the Juste-milieu says, 2 times 2 are 5".

In Notes from Underground (1864), by Feodor Dostoevsky, the anonymous protagonist accepts the falsehood of "two plus two equals five", and considers the implications (ontological and epistemological) of rejecting the truth of "two times two makes four", and proposed that the intellectualism of free will—Man's inherent capability to choose or to reject logic and illogic—is the cognitive ability that makes humanity human: "I admit that twice two makes four is an excellent thing, but, if we are to give everything its due, twice two makes five is sometimes a very charming thing, too."

In the literary vignette "Prayer" (1881), Ivan Turgenev said that: "Whatever a man prays for, he prays for a miracle. Every prayer reduces itself to this: 'Great God, grant that twice two be not four'." In God and the State (1882), Bakunin dismissed deism: "Imagine a philosophical vinegar sauce of the most opposed systems, a mixture of Fathers of the Church, scholastic philosophers, Descartes and Pascal, Kant and Scottish psychologists, all this a superstructure on the divine and innate ideas of Plato, and covered up with a layer of Hegelian immanence, accompanied, of course, by an ignorance, as contemptuous as it is complete, of natural science, and proving, just as two times two make five, the existence of a personal god." Moreover, the slogan "two plus two equals five", is the title of the collection of absurdist short stories Deux et deux font cinq (Two and Two Make Five, 1895), by Alphonse Allais; and the title of the imagist art manifesto 2 x 2 = 5 (1920), by the poet Vadim Shershenevich.

In 1931, the artist Yakov Guminer supported Stalin's shortened production schedule for the economy of the Soviet Union with a propaganda poster that announced the "Arithmetic of an Alternative Plan: 2 + 2 plus the Enthusiasm of the Workers = 5" after Stalin's announcement, in 1930, that the first five-year plan (1928–1933) instead would be completed in 1932, in four years' time.

== George Orwell ==
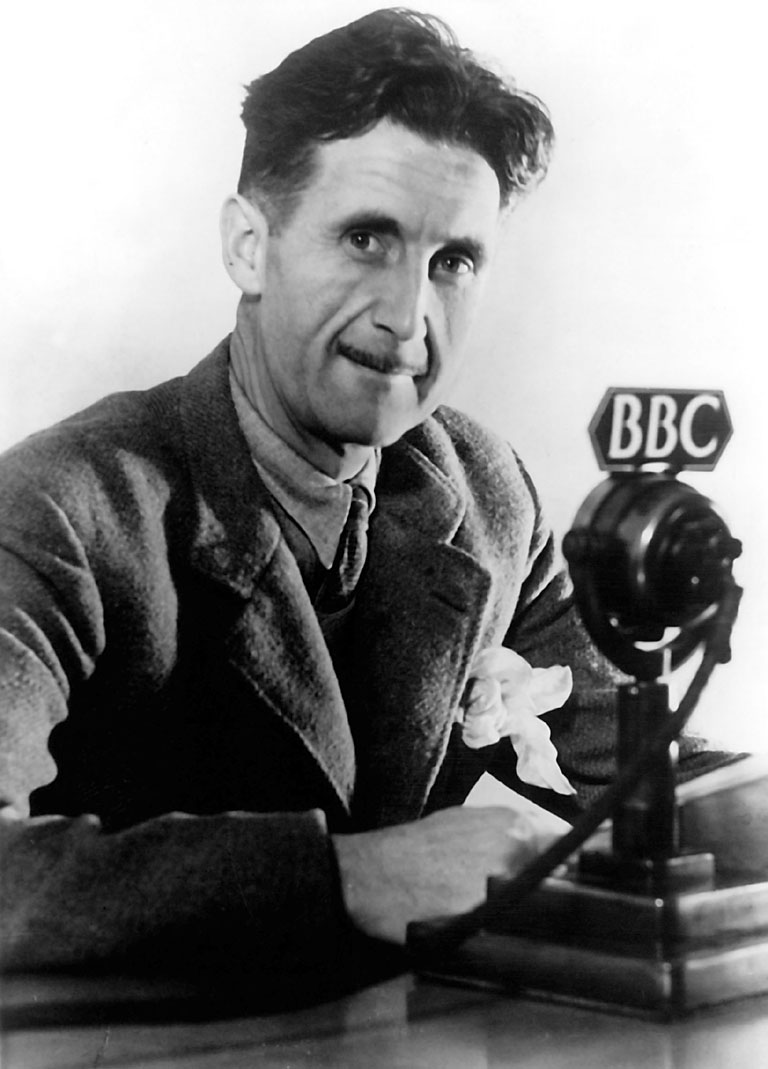
Author George Orwell, who worked as a propagandist at the BBC during the Second World War

In George Orwell's Nineteen Eighty-Four, 2 + 2 = 5 appears as a possible statement of Ingsoc (English Socialism). The Party slogan "War Is Peace, Freedom Is Slavery, Ignorance Is Strength" is a dogma which the Party expects the citizens of Oceania to accept as true. Writing in his secret diary in the year 1984, the protagonist Winston Smith ponders if the Party might declare "two plus two equals five" as fact, as well as whether or not belief in such a consensus reality substantiates the lie. About the falsity of "two plus two equals five", in the Ministry of Love, the interrogator O'Brien tells the thought criminal Smith that control over physical reality is unimportant to the Party, provided the citizens of Oceania subordinate their real-world perceptions to the political will of the Party. O'Brien shows four fingers of his hand and asks Smith how many he sees; Smith says "four". O'Brien repeatedly tortures Smith, who insists that he sees only four fingers and that "two and two are four". O'Brien replies: "Sometimes, Winston. Sometimes they are five. Sometimes they are three. Sometimes they are all of them at once".

Orwell used the idea of 2 + 2 = 5 in an essay of January 1939 in The Adelphi; "Review of Power: A New Social Analysis by Bertrand Russell":

It is quite possible that we are descending into an age in which two plus two will make five when the Leader says so.

In propaganda work for the BBC during the Second World War, Orwell applied the illogic of 2 + 2 = 5 to counter the reality-denying psychology of Nazi propaganda, which he addressed in the essay "Looking Back on the Spanish War" (1943):

Nazi theory, indeed, specifically denies that such a thing as "the truth" exists. There is, for instance, no such thing as "Science". There is only "German Science", "Jewish Science", etc. The implied objective of this line of thought is a nightmare world in which the Leader, or some ruling clique, controls not only the future, but the past. If the Leader says of such and such an event, "It never happened"—well, it never happened. If he says that "two and two are five"—well, two and two are five. This prospect frightens me much more than bombs—and, after our experiences of the last few years [the Blitz, 1940–41] that is not a frivolous statement.

In addressing Nazi anti-intellectualism, Orwell's reference might have been Hermann Göring's hyperbolic praise of Adolf Hitler: "If the Führer wants it, two and two makes five!" In the political novel Nineteen Eighty-Four, concerning the Party's philosophy of government for Oceania, Orwell said:

In the end, the Party would announce that two and two made five, and you would have to believe it. It was inevitable that they should make that claim sooner or later: the logic of their position demanded it. Not merely the validity of experience, but the very existence of external reality, was tacitly denied by their philosophy. The heresy of heresies was common sense. And what was terrifying was not that they would kill you for thinking otherwise, but that they might be right. For, after all, how do we know that two and two make four? Or that the force of gravity works? Or that the past is unchangeable? If both the past and the external world exist only in the mind, and if the mind itself is controllable—what then?

The 1951 British edition of the text, published by Secker & Warburg, erroneously omitted the "5", thus rendering it simply as "2 + 2 =". This error, likely the result of a typesetting mistake, remained in all further editions of the text until the 1987 edition, whereafter a correction was made based on Orwell's original typescript. This misprint did not exist in the American editions of the text, with British students of the text in the meanwhile misinterpreting Orwell's original intentions.

== Contemporary usage ==
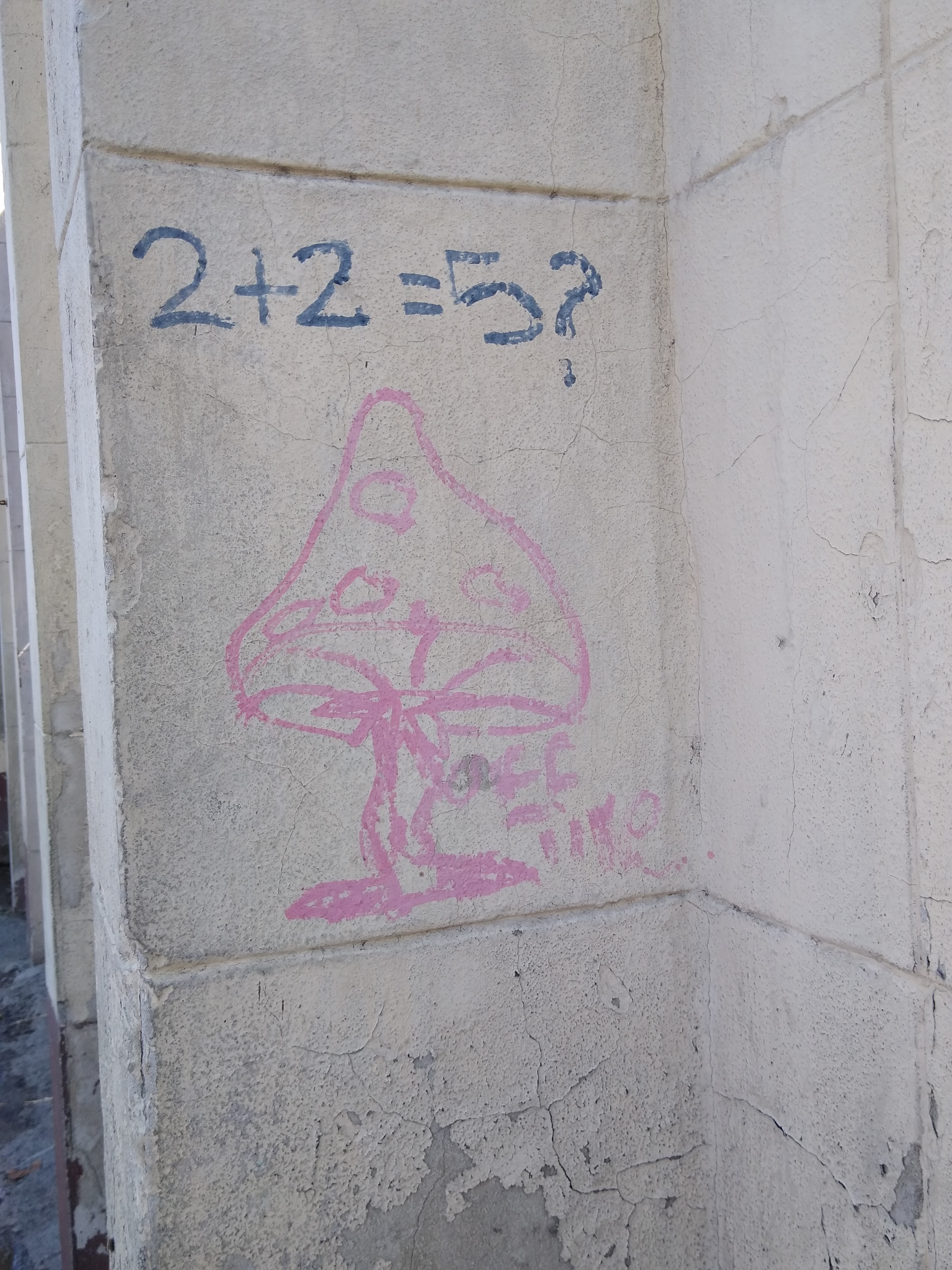
Political graffiti in Havana, Cuba questioning government policy perceived to be "2+2=5"

In The Cult of the Amateur: How Today's Internet is Killing Our Culture (2007), the media critic Andrew Keen uses the slogan "two plus two equals five" to criticise the Wikipedia policy allowing any user to edit the encyclopedia — that the enthusiasm of the amateur for user generated content, peer production, and Web 2.0 technology leads to an encyclopedia of common knowledge, and not an encyclopedia of expert knowledge; that the "wisdom of the crowd" will distort what society considers to be the truth.

In 2020, a social media debate followed biostatistics PhD student Kareem Carr's statement, "If someone says 2+2=5, the correct response is, 'What are your definitions and axioms?' not a rant about the decline of Western civilization".

== See also ==
- 1=2
- Indiana pi bill
- 1x1=2, the centrel tenet of Terryology
