= Joseph Patrick McDonnell =

American journalist

- Born: 27 March 1846; Dublin, Ireland
- Died: 20 January 1906 (aged 59)
- Occupations: Labor leader, journalist
- Known for: Labor Standard newspaper

Joseph Patrick McDonnell (27 March 1846 – 20 January 1906) was an Irish-American labor leader and journalist. He edited the New York Labor Standard, and was one of the founders of the International Labor Union.

== Early years ==
Joseph Patrick McDonnell was born in Dublin, Ireland on 27 March 1846. He was born into a middle-class family, and after secondary school went to Trinity College Dublin to prepare for a career as a priest. However, as a Nationalist he would not take the Oath of Allegiance. He joined the Fenians, an Irish independence movement, and worked as an editor on Nationalist Irish newspapers. For this he was arrested and jailed for ten months in Dublin.

McDonnell moved to London in 1868, where he gave lectures calling for the release of Irish political prisoners and for Irish independence. He arranged demonstrations to publicize the cause of Irish independence, and was twice arrested. He attended an International Peace Conference in Geneva and an International Prison Conference in London. During the Franco-Prussian War (1870–71) he organized an "Irish Brigade", planning to go to France to support the republicans against the Germans. He was again arrested for this. He shared the enthusiasm for the Paris Commune felt by many radicals and socialists in London.

McDonnell met Karl Marx on 18 June 1871, and Marx proposed him as a member of the general council of the International Workingmen's Association (IWMA - often called the First International). In August 1871 he was made IWMA secretary for Ireland and threw himself into organizing branches. In early 1872 branches were founded in Dublin, Cork, Belfast and Cootehill. Though the Irish section of the New York IWMA drew its membership from a large pool of émigré Fenians, the popular association of the IWMA with the anti-clerical violence of the Paris Commune created problems for it when attempting to organise in Ireland. Jeremiah O'Donovan Rossa wrote in condemnation of the execution of Georges Darboy, and most Fenians shied away from anything that appeared to support the Commune.

== New York ==
In 1872 McDonnell sailed to New York City with his new bride, Mary McEvatt, to represent the IWA in America. From 1873 to 1878 McDonnell was very active in the socialist movement in New York, speaking at many venues. He edited a Marxist weekly paper, the New York Labor Standard, from 1876. The socialist and anarchist Marie Le Compte was one of the editors on this paper. He met Samuel Gompers, Peter J. McGuire and other labor leaders, and became more interested in labor reform than in socialism. They would often meet at the New York offices of the Irish World, where they would find men such as Philip Van Patten of the Socialist Labor Party and the Irish nationalist John Devoy. With Gompers and McGuire, he was one of the founders of the International Labor Union.

McDonnell was a leading figure in the Association of United Workers of America (AUWA). In 1876 the AUWA and other socialist organizations merged to form the Workingmen's Party of the United States (WPUS). At a meeting in October 1876 McDonnell's section of the WPUS declared that,

Whereas—All issues raised by the political parties of the propertied class are in the interest of that class and of no advantage to the working class. Be it resolved, That it is the duty of the working class to ignore not only all the existing political parties but their issues and to support only those questions raised by and coming from recognized Trade and Labor bodies, made in the interest of the working class."

In the fall of 1876 the Labor Standard ran a campaign that opposed the WPUS taking immediate political action. The faction of the WPUS that favored action withdrew their support from the paper, which ran into financial difficulties. At first McDonnell remained largely unknown outside the small and quarrelsome labor and socialist movements. In 1877 there were railway strikes and riots in New York and Baltimore in 1877, where he urged the workers to organize.

The New York Times commented in August 1877 that McDonnell was preaching "the unadulterated gospel of communism". The Socialist Labor Party of America was founded in 1877 by a Marxist-oriented group in Newark led by Friedrich A. Sorge. McDonnell gave significant assistance to Sorge.

== New Jersey ==
Sorge and McDonnell organized a textile strike in Paterson, New Jersey in 1878. In 1878 McDonnell moved to Paterson at the request of the striking cotton-spinners at the R. & H. Adams mill. On 28 September 1878 he renamed his paper the Paterson Labor Standard. The masthead carried Marx's words: "The Emancipation of the Working Classes Must be Achieved by the Working Classes Themselves." Soon after the first issue appeared he was indicted for libel for using the word "scab" to describe strikebreaking workers. He was convicted and ordered to pay a fine of $500. This sum was raised for him by the strikers. He was to nurse his paper through its early difficulties and edit it for the remainder of his life. His editorials were outspoken. He denounced the "industrial despotism" of employers and called for labor to become master of its own products rather than the slave of capitalism.

In 1879 McDonnell was among the founders of the New Jersey Labor Congress, later renamed the Federation of Organized Trades and Labor Unions of the State of New Jersey. In February 1880 he was tried again for libel after publishing a letter from a brick maker who said of the Clark & Van Blarcom brickyard that the men were overworked and starved, and housed in places no better than pigsties. He was convicted and sentenced to two months in jail. He continued to edit the Labor Standard from jail. When he was released on 1 April 1880 he was met by a cheering crowd. In 1881 the Labor Standard was appointed as one of the State papers to print the laws. In 1883 Lawrence Fell was appointed the first New Jersey state factory inspector. He worked with McDonnell and the state federation of labor to promote reforms sought by the labor movement.

New Jersey supreme court judge Jonathan Dixon had presided over the much-publicized 1880 libel trial. He was the Republican candidate for New Jersey governor in 1883. In a break from his socialist past, McDonnell supported the Democrats in the gubernatorial contest. McDonnell attacked Dixon as anti-labor and anti-union, and threw his support behind Leon Abbett, giving a useful boost to the Democratic candidate. In 1884 Leon Abbett, now governor of New Jersey, appointed McDonnell deputy inspector of factories and workshops, although he did not hold this position for long.

From 1883 until 1897 McDonnell chaired the legislative committee of the New Jersey Federation of Organized Trades, which remained a relatively small body that was further weakened by the dispute between the Knights of Labor and the craft unions. Despite its weakness, the legislative committee drafted laws and lobbied for their passage by the New Jersey legislature, and often achieved at least partial success. The thrust of the laws was to eliminate abuses of labor, improve working conditions and help labor organize unions, cooperatives and building and loan associations. The Federation obtained ballot reforms, protection against eviction, public libraries and a compulsory education law. It was mainly due to McDonnell's efforts that Labor Day was declared a holiday by New Jersey, to first state to do so.

McDonnell represented New Jersey in the American Federation of Labor, founded in 1886 with Gompers as its first president. In 1892 McDonnell was appointed the head of the State Board of Arbitration for a short period. After 1892 McDonnell found it much harder to influence legislation. However, in 1897 The Boston Post wrote,

Every labor law on the state statute books of New Jersey owes its birth to the fostering care and indefatigable work of McDonnell... Not a tithe can be told of all he has done for the betterment of mankind.

Joseph Patrick McDonnell died on 20 January 1906.
