= Scorpion and Felix =

1837 comedic story by Karl Marx

Scorpion and Felix, A Humoristic Novel
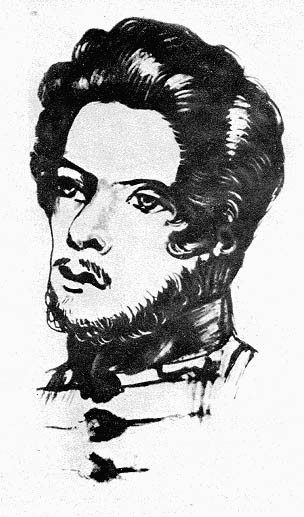
- Karl Marx as a student in 1836.
- Author: Karl Marx
- Original title: Skorpion und Felix, Humoristischer Roman
- Language: German
- Genre: Comedic novel
- Publisher: not published
- Publication place: Germany
- Media type: unfinished manuscript

Scorpion and Felix, A Humoristic Novel (German: Skorpion und Felix, Humoristischer Roman) is the only comedic fictional story to have been written by Karl Marx. Written in 1837 when he was 19 years old, it has remained unpublished. It was likely written under the influence of The Life and Opinions of Tristram Shandy, Gentleman by Laurence Sterne.

== Description ==
The novel is told by a first-person narrator in the present tense. The plot revolves around three main characters, Felix, Scorpion, and Merten, and their quest to uncover their origins. The novel seems to take an ironic polemic with philosophy. It has also been described as satirical.

The novel was never finished. Only some chapters of the novel survive to the modern day. Parts of the novel could have been burned by Marx himself, along with some other early works of his. The parts that survive are those fragments that Marx included as a supplement when he published his Book of Verse (1837).

The surviving fragments of Marx's novel were published in English for the first time in 1975 as part of Volume 1 of Marx-Engels Collected Works.

== Reception and analysis ==
The surviving fragments of the book's manuscript have not been well regarded. Francis Wheen in his biography of Marx characterizes the work as "a nonsensical torrent of whimsy and persiflage" which was "dashed off in a fit of intoxicated whimsy", although he notes that a paragraph from that novel appears in a slightly changed form as a "famous opening paragraph" in The Eighteenth Brumaire of Louis Bonaparte.

Siegbert Salomon Prawer noted that the book is notable for being Marx's first attempt to discuss politics, and that it begins his polemic with Hegel. Anna Kornbluh, however, argued that the piece is a polemic with Locke, Fichte, and Kant, but not Hegel. She also commented more positively on the novel, concluding that it shows how even a young Marx "pursued logico-formal connections behind the veil of the visible, how thoroughly he tracked different forms of appearance of the real within ontologically positive reality".

== See also ==
- Oulanem, later unfinished play by Marx
