= Abraham Jacobi =

American pediatrician (1830–1919)

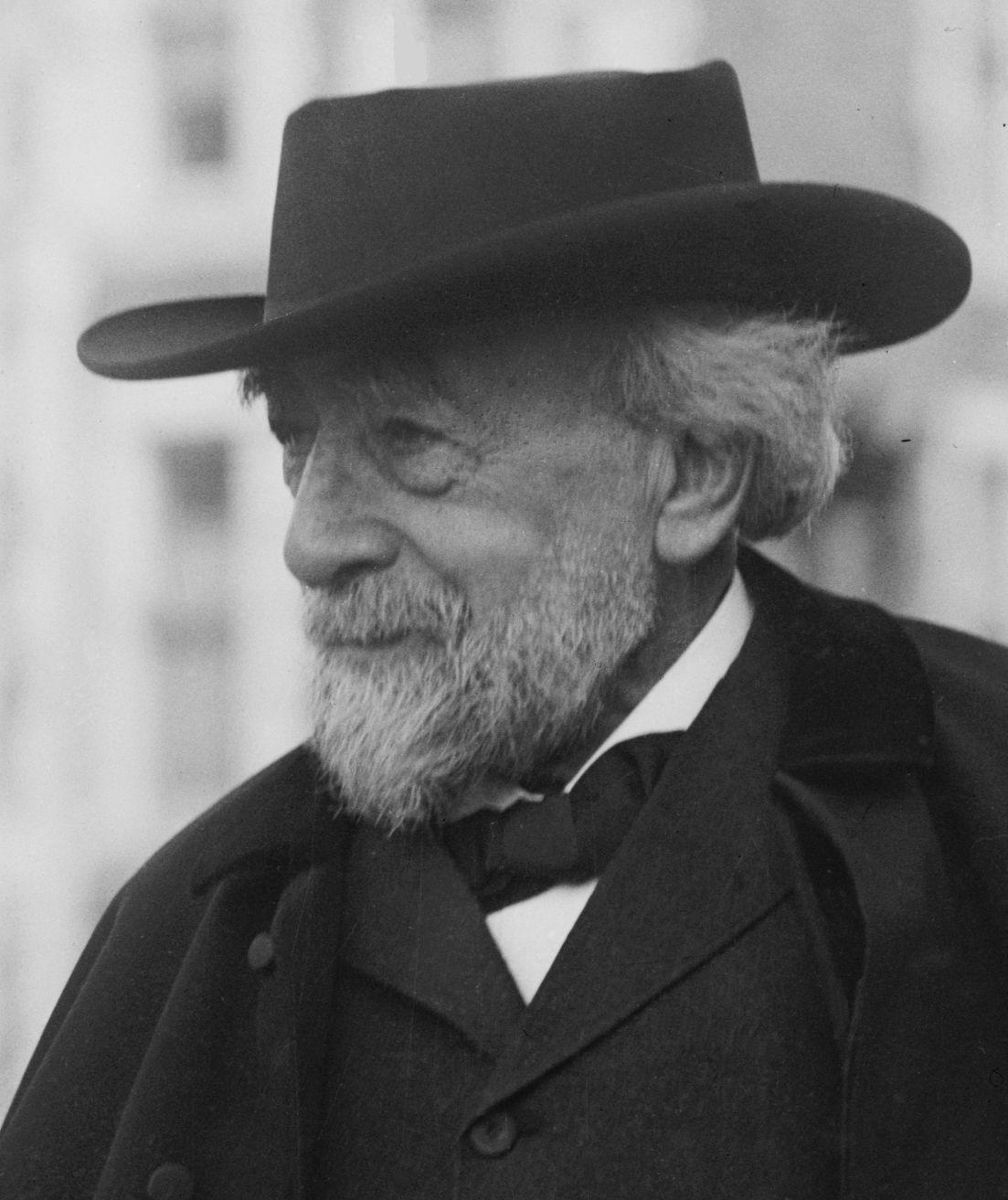
- Jacobi in 1912
- Born: 6 May 1830; Hartum, Westphalia, Prussia
- Died: 10 July 1919 (aged 89); Bolton Landing, New York, U.S.
- Spouses: Fanny Meier (died 1856) Kate Rosalie Dessafo (m. 1862; died 1871) Mary Putnam (m. 1873; died 1906)
- Children: 8

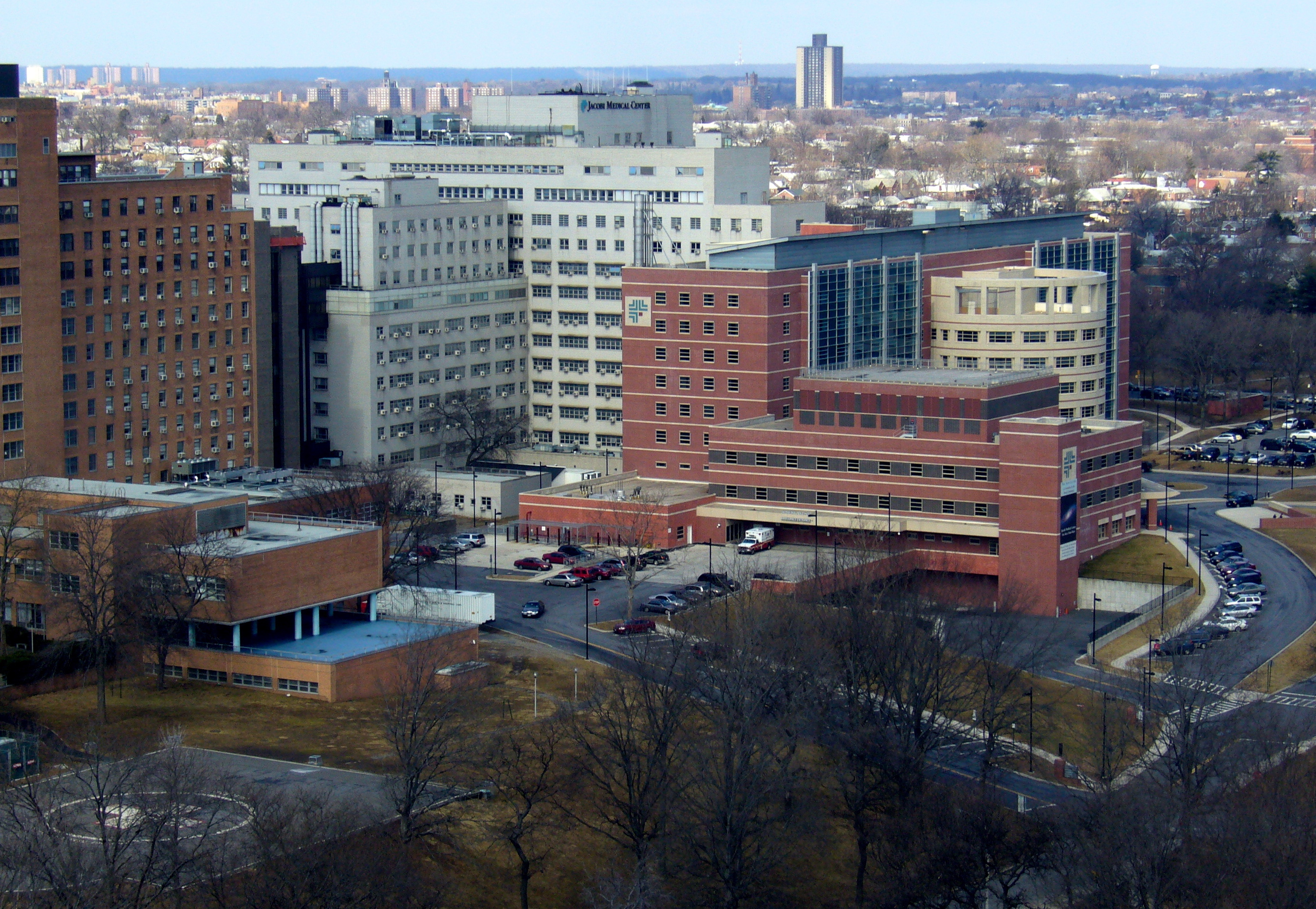
Jacobi Medical Center in New York City

Abraham Jacobi (6 May 1830 – 10 July 1919) was a German physician and pioneer of pediatrics. He was a key figure in the movement to improve child healthcare and welfare in the United States and opened the first children's clinic in the country. To date, he is the only foreign-born president of the American Medical Association. He helped found the American Journal of Obstetrics. He is regarded as the Father of American Pediatrics.

== Biography ==
Born in Hartum (now a district of Hille), Westphalia, he was the son of a poor Jewish shopkeeper and his wife, who educated him at great sacrifice. He attended the gymnasium in Minden. After graduating there, he studied medicine at the universities of Greifswald, Göttingen, and Bonn, receiving a Doctor of Medicine at Bonn in 1851. Shortly thereafter, Jacobi joined the revolutionary movement in Germany (see Revolution of 1848). He was detained in prisons at Berlin and Cologne in 1851, where he was acquitted as defendant in the Cologne Communist Trial in 1852. Later he was imprisoned at Bielefeld and Minden, where he was convicted of lese Majeste in 1853.

Upon release, Jacobi sailed to England, where he stayed with both Karl Marx and Friedrich Engels. In the following autumn he moved to New York City where he settled as a practicing physician. He soon became a key figure in the movement to improve child healthcare and welfare in the United States.

He remained in contact with Marx and Engels and in 1857 Jacobi was involved in founding the New York Communist Club.

Starting in 1861 at New York Medical College, he was a professor of childhood diseases. From 1867 to 1870, he was chair of the medical department of the University of the City of New York. He taught at Columbia University for 30+ years from 1870 to 1902. He later moved to Mount Sinai Hospital, where he established the first Department of Pediatrics at a general hospital.

He was president of the New York Pathological and Obstetrical Societies, and twice of the Medical Society of the County of New York, visiting physician to the German Hospital beginning 1857, to Mount Sinai Hospital beginning 1860, to the Hebrew Orphan Asylum and the infant hospital on Randall's Island beginning 1868, and to Bellevue Hospital beginning 1874. In 1882 he was president of the New York State Medical Society, and in 1885 became president of the New York Academy of Medicine. From 1868 to 1871, he was joint editor of the American Journal of Obstetrics and Diseases of Women and Children.

Civic work was an important part of his life. He advocated for birth control and civil service reform, and opposed prohibition. Jacobi was strongly anti-Hohenzollern during World War I. In the summer of 1918, a house fire destroyed the manuscript of his autobiography, and other personal papers at his Lake George home.

He died on 10 July 1919 at his summer home in Bolton Landing at age 89. Jacobi is interred at Green-Wood Cemetery in Brooklyn, New York.

== Family ==
His first wife, Fanny Meier (1833−1856), was a sister of Sophie Meyer Boas (1828−1916), the mother of ethnologist Franz Boas, who also attended the gymnasium in Minden. In 1873, he married Mary Putnam, also a physician. She was the very first female student at the Faculté de Médecine de Paris in Paris, France. They had three children, only one of whom—Marjorie—survived to adulthood.

== Works ==
- Contributions to Midwifery and Diseases of Women and Children (with E. Noeggerath; New York, 1859)
- Dentition and its Derangements (1862)
- The Raising and Education of Abandoned Children in Europe (1870)
- Infant Diet (1874)
- Treatise on Diphtheria (1880)

Jacobi contributed chapters on the care and nutrition of children, diphtheria, and dysentery to Gerhardt's Handbuch der Kinderkrankheiten (Tübingen, 1877), and on diphtheria, rachitis, and laryngitis to Pepper's System of Practical Medicine (Philadelphia), and has published lectures and reports on midwifery and female and infantile disease, and a number of articles in medical journals. His Sarcoma of the Kidney in the Fœtus and Infant is printed in the Transactions of the International Medical Congress in Copenhagen.

== Legacy ==
- Abraham Jacobi and Carl Schurz Memorial Park in Bolton Landing, New York
- A collection of his papers is held at the National Library of Medicine in Bethesda, Maryland.
- Jacobi Medical Center in New York City was named in his honor
- William Osler, founder of Johns Hopkins Medicine, said of Abraham Jacobi, "It may be said that the safety of a nation depends on the care of its infants and no one in this country has done so much for their bodily welfare as Dr. Jacobi. Had they any other language but a cry, countless thousands of colic-stricken babies...would ordain great praise to him " on 6 May 1900 (Jacobi's 70th birthday).

== See also ==
- Jacobi Medical Center in the Bronx, New York
