= Napoléon le Petit =

1852 political pamphlet by Victor Hugo

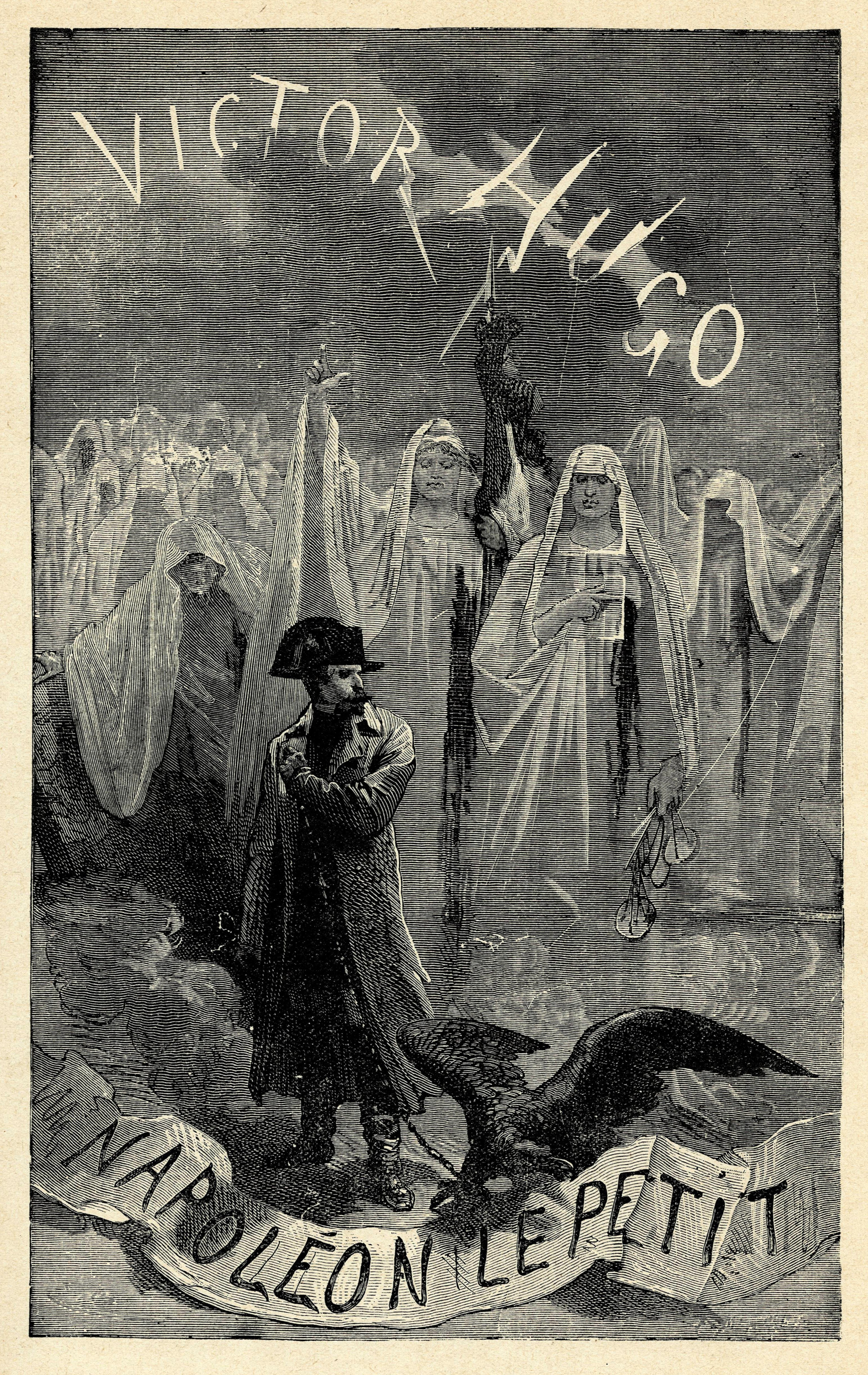
Illustration from the book Napoleon le Petit by Victor Hugo, published by Albin Michel, c. 1922

Napoléon le Petit (French; literally "Napoleon the Small") was an influential political pamphlet by Victor Hugo, published in 1852. It criticised the rule of Napoleon III and the politics of the Second French Empire for which he left Belgium, and later was expelled to Jersey. Hugo lived in exile in Guernsey for most of Napoleon III's reign and his criticism was significant because he was one of the most prominent Frenchmen of the time and widely respected.

The work was the first to use the adage that 2 + 2 = 5 as a denial of truth by authority, a notion later used by George Orwell in Nineteen Eighty-Four.

Volumes were smuggled into France (e.g. in bales of hay, and between metal sheets as a tin of sardines), read at secret meetings, and hand-copied.

== See also ==
- The Eighteenth Brumaire of Louis Napoleon (1852)
