= New York Communist Club =

Communist Club of New York
- Founder: Friedrich Sorge; Albert Komp; Abraham Jacobi
- Founded: October 25, 1857; 169 years ago
- Dissolved: July 2, 1867; 159 years ago
- Preceded by: American Workers League
- Merged into: International Workingmen's Association in America
- Headquarters: New York City
- Ideology: Communism; Humanism; Abolitionism
- Political position: Far-left

The New York Communist Club was a communist organisation set up in New York City in 1857. It was particularly active in the abolitionist struggle.

Around 30 German immigrants formed the New York Communist Club on October 25, 1857, at a meeting at 148 Fulton Street, New York City. It was the only socialist organization before the American Civil War that allowed black people to join. Friedrich Sorge, Albert Komp and Abraham Jacobi were involved in forming the organisation. The Club adopted as a fundamental principle that "every [doctrine] not founded on the perception of concrete objects" should be rejected. They also stated: "We recognize no distinction as to nationality or race, caste, or status, color, or sex; our goal is but reconciliation of all human interests, freedom, and happiness for mankind, and the realization and unification of a world republic."

The club did not hold any meetings during the Civil War as so many of its members joined the Union army. Fritz Jacobi, vice-president of the club, died at the Battle of Fredericksburg.

In 1867, the New York Communist Club affiliated as Section 1 of the International Workingmen's Association.

== Works cited ==
- Foner, Philip (1977). American Socialism and Black Americans: From The Age of Jackson to World War II. Greenwood Publishing Group. ISBN 0837195454.
- Foner, Philip (1977). "Statuten Des Kommunisten Klubs in New York". Science & Society. 41 (3). Guilford Press: 334–37. doi:10.2307/40402034. JSTOR 40402034.
