= 41st Missouri Infantry Regiment =

- Active: August 1864 – July 11, 1865
- Country: United States
- Allegiance: Union
- Branch: Infantry

The 41st Missouri Infantry Regiment was an infantry regiment that served in the Union Army during the American Civil War.

== Service ==
The 41st Missouri Infantry Regiment was organized at Benton Barracks August through September 1864 and mustered on September 16, 1864, for one year service under the command of Colonel Joseph Weydemeyer. The regiment served garrison duty at St. Louis, Missouri, until July 1865.

The 41st Missouri Infantry mustered out July 11, 1865.

== Casualties ==
The regiment lost a total of 37 men during service; 1 enlisted man killed, 2 officers and 34 enlisted men died of disease.

== Commanders ==
- Colonel Joseph Weydemeyer

== See also ==
- Missouri Civil War Union units
- Missouri in the Civil War
