= Oulanem =

Play by Karl Marx

Oulanem, A Tragedy is a poetic play written by Karl Marx in 1839 during his years as a student, at the age of 21. The action takes place in a mountain town in Italy where a mysterious German stranger, Oulanem, and his companion, Lucindo, arrive. The play was translated into English first by Robert Payne in 1971.

== Characters ==
- Oulanem – a German traveller
- Lucindo – Oulanem's companion
- Pertini – a citizen of a mountain town in Italy
- Alwander – a citizen of the same town
- Beatrice – Alwander's foster-daughter
- Wierin
- Perto – a monk

== Analysis ==
Marx only completed the first act of the play. The titular character's name is an anagram of Manuelo, which is believed to be a reference to Immanuel, one of the biblical names for Jesus Christ. The first act includes a soliloquy in which Oulanem laments mortality and the inevitable destruction of the world by God, and asks himself if he must destroy the world in turn in defiance. This closely echoes themes from Goethe's "Prometheus", an 18th-century poem much admired by authors of the early Romantic era.

"All lost! The hour is now expired, and time
Stands still. This pigmy universe collapses.
Soon I shall clasp Eternity and howl
Humanity's giant curse into its ear.
Eternity! It is eternal pain,
Death inconceivable, immeasurable!
An evil artifice contrived to taunt us,
Who are but clockwork, blind machines wound up
To be the calendar-fools of Time; to be,
Only that something thus at least might happen;
And to decay, that there might be decay!
[...]
And we, we Apes of a cold God, still cherish
With frenzied pain upon our loving breast
The viper so voluptuously warm,
That it as Universal Form rears up
And from its place on high grins down on us!
And in our ear, till loathing's all consumed,
The weary wave roars onward, ever onward!
Now quick, the die is cast, and all is ready;
Destroy what only poetry's lie contrived,
A curse shall finish what a curse conceived."

== See also ==
- Scorpion and Felix, earlier unfinished novel by Marx
