= Joseph Weydemeyer =

German revolutionary and US Union Army officer

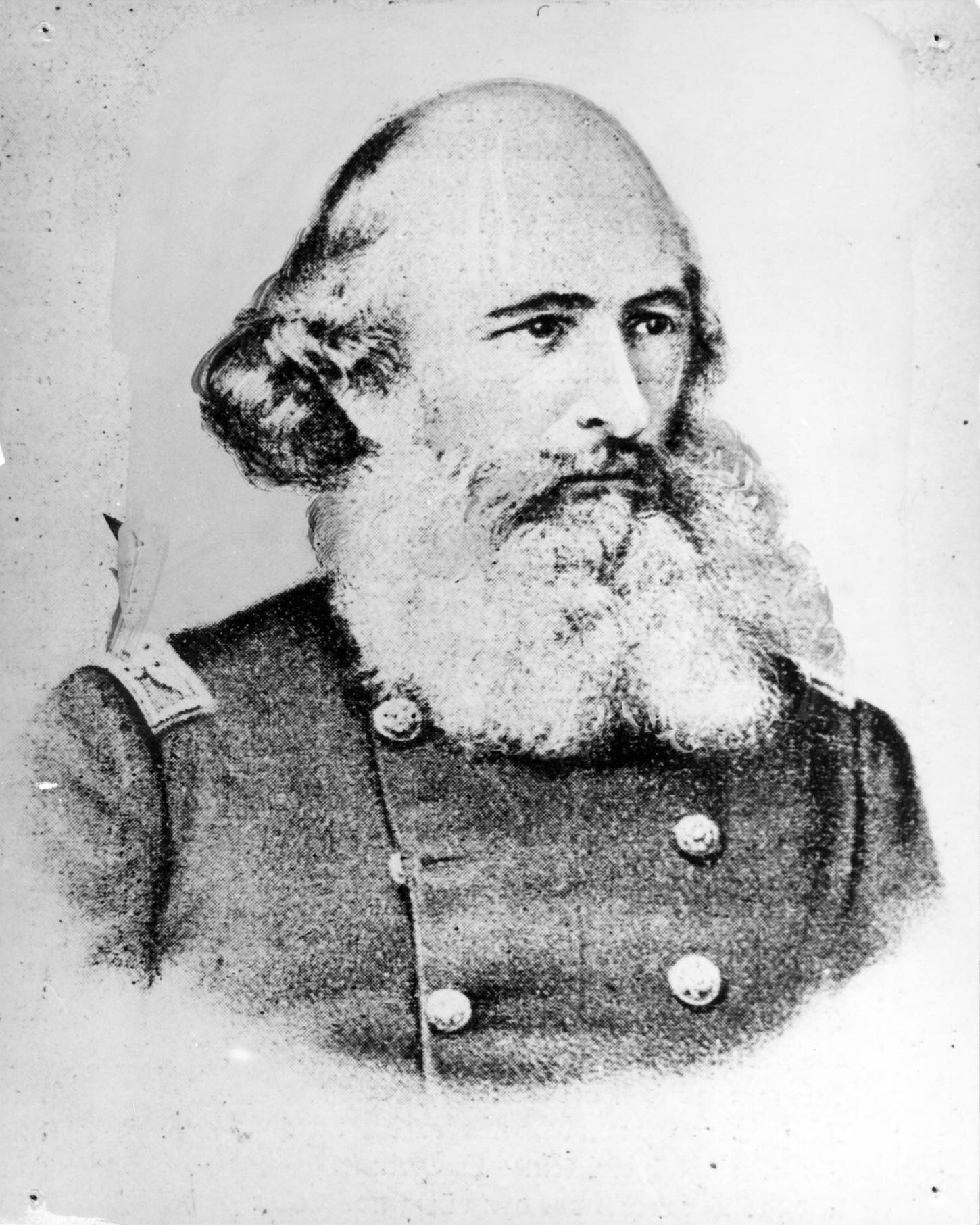

St. Louis County Auditor
- In office January 1, 1866 – August 20, 1866
- Preceded by: Henry T. Mudd
- Succeeded by: William H. Heath

Personal details
- Born: 2 February 1818 Münster, Province of Westphalia, Kingdom of Prussia
- Died: 20 August 1866 (aged 48) St. Louis, Missouri, U.S.
- Party: Communist League (1847–1851); American Workers League (1853–1855); Republican (after 1855)
- Other political affiliations: Radical Union (1865)
- Children: 2

Military service
- Allegiance: United States
- Branch/service: United States Army
- Years of service: 1861–1863; 1864–1865
- Rank: Colonel
- Unit: 41st Missouri Infantry Regiment
- Battles/wars: Civil War

Joseph Arnold Weydemeyer (February 2, 1818 – August 20, 1866) was a military officer in the Kingdom of Prussia and the United States as well as a journalist, politician and Marxist revolutionary.

At first a supporter of "true socialism", Weydemeyer became in 1845–1846 a follower of Karl Marx and Friedrich Engels and a member of the League of Communists, heading its Frankfurt chapter from 1849 to 1851. He visited Marx in Brussels, staying there for a time to attend Marx's lectures. He participated in the 1848 Revolution. He was one of the "responsible editors" of the Neue Rheinische Zeitung from 1849 to 1850. He acted on Marx's behalf in the failed publication of the manuscript of The German Ideology.

Weydemeyer worked on two socialist periodicals which were the Westphälisches Dampfboot ("Westphalian Steamboat") and the Neue Rheinische Zeitung. In 1851, he emigrated from Germany to the United States and worked there as a journalist. The Eighteenth Brumaire of Louis Napoleon, written by Marx, was published in 1852 in Die Revolution, a German-language monthly magazine in New York established by Weydemeyer.

Weydemeyer took part in the American Civil War as a lieutenant colonel in the Union Army.

== Early years ==
Born in 1818, the same year as Karl Marx, Weydemeyer was the son of a Prussian civil servant residing in Münster, Westphalia. Sent to a gymnasium and the Berlin military Academy, he received his commission as a Leutnant in the Prussian artillery (1. Westfälisches Feldartillerie-Regiment Nr. 7) in 1838. At the beginning of his short career, he was stationed in the Westphalian town of Minden. He began to read the bourgeois radical and socialist newspaper Rheinische Zeitung, the Cologne paper of which Marx became editor and which was suppressed by Prussian censorship in 1843. But it inspired many soldiers in the Rhineland and Westphalia. In the Minden garrison, the paper inspired revolutionaries like Fritz Anneke, August Willich, Hermann Korff, and Friedrich von Beust, all of whom, like Weydemeyer, will become prominent Forty-Eighters and after that officers of the Union army in the Civil War.

The leftist officers in Minden formed a circle in which Weydemeyer took part. He also went frequently to Cologne and took part to discussions of social problems with the journalists of the Rheinische Zeitung. In 1844, Weydemeyer resigned from the Prussian army. He then became assistant editor of the Trier'sche Zeitung, a paper which advocated the Phalansteries of Charles Fourier and the True Socialism of Karl Gruen. In 1845, he joined the Westphaelische Dampfboot after paying a visit to Marx, exiled in Paris. Marx, as well as Engels, were publishing in the Dampfboot. The paper was edited by Heinrich Otto Lüning in Bielefeld and Paderborn. Lüning's sister Luise became Weydemeyer's wife in 1845.

=== 1848 ===
After a second visit to Marx in Brussels in 1846, Weydemeyer went back to Germany to organize the Communist League in Cologne. This was the organization for which Marx and Engels wrote the Communist Manifesto in 1847. He continued to work on the Dampfboot. At the same time, he made a career as a construction engineer for the Cologne–Minden Railroad, but he quit the job soon after the beginning in 1848 because the company ordered its employees to stay out of political demonstration.

During the rest of the year, he was a full-time revolutionary journalist. In June 1848, he was invited to Darmstadt by the socialist publisher C. W. Leske to be co-editor with Heinrich Otto Lüning of the Neue Deutsche Zeitung. Near to Frankfurt, where the German National Assembly was meeting at the time, the newspaper intended to be a link between the left wing of the Assembly and the extra-parliamentary movement. But in 1849, the counter-revolution succeeded and the Prussian absolutism crushed the Frankfurt Parliament, the armed democracy in Baden and the Electorate of the Palatinate and all the democratic papers. Marx's Neue Rheinische Zeitung disappeared under the censorship and the Neue Deutsche Zeitung survived by moving from Darmstadt to Frankfurt in the spring of 1849. The paper would be finally banished in December 1850 by the senate of the city. Weydemeyer remained in the country for half a year, underground.

In July 1851, with his wife and two children, he went to Switzerland, where he did not find a job. On July 27, he wrote to Marx that he had no alternative than migrating to the United States. In his answer to Weydemeyer, Marx recommend New York City for his settlement, a place where Weydemeyer could have the chance to create a German-speaking revolutionary paper. At the same time, it was, for Marx, the city where the migrants were less likely to be touched by the Far West adventures. Marx also remarked that the United States would be a difficult country for the development of socialism, the surplus of population, being drained off by the farms and the fast-growing prosperity of the country, the Germans being easily Americanized and forgetting of their homeland. Weydemeyer and his family sailed from Le Havre on September 29, 1851, and arrived in New York on November 7.

== New York ==
=== A Marxist journalist ===
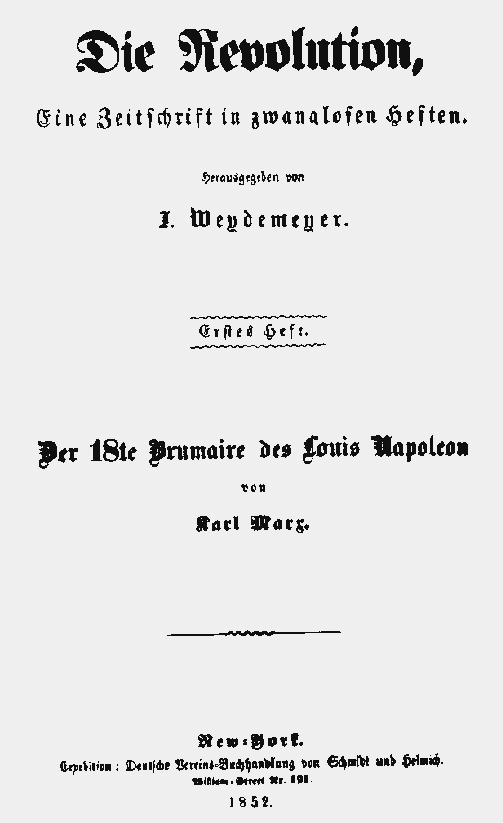
Die Revolution

In December 1851, Weydemeyer issues a paper, named Die Revolution, a German-language revolutionary paper, which purpose was to make picture of the class struggle in the Old World. The paper first appeared on January 6 but was suspended on January 13. In a letter to Marx at the end of January, he attributed his failure because of the corrupting effect on the people of the American soil. He also pointed out the dominance of the liberal bourgeois-nationalist ideology on the people, among them Gottfried Kinkel and Lajos Kossuth. German immigrants were simply not sensitive to Marx ideas and analyses of the defeat of the 1848 revolutions and of the triumph of European reaction. In spring 1852, Weydemeyer brought out Marx's Eighteenth Brumaire of Louis Bonaparte as a final number of Die Revolution, after arranging for serial publication of Engels The Peasant War in Germany in the New York Turn-Zeitung between January 1852 and February 1853.

He began to write for the Turn-Zeitung about different political issues, as the American aversion of the proletarian dictatorship, the calling of liberal American groups for free election in Europe and their silence about the conditions of the workers, the political immaturity of forty-eighters who raised money in the United States to foment revolution in Europe. To sum up, he wrote many articles which counterposed Marxism to liberalism for the German immigrants. In the July number of Turn-Zeitung, he began a discussion of American labor issues and the free trade versus protection debate, where he took a traditional Marxist stand for the industrial development.

In the Turn-Zeitung of September 1, Weydemeyer analyzed the relationship between Australian cotton and American slavery. The development of American monopoly on the world market, in his point of view, promotes the rise of national economical development rather than regional and the rise of national parties in American politics rather than regional. He saw the shift from an agricultural dominance over the industrial to an industrial dominance over the former.

In the Turn-Zeitung of November 15, Weydemeyer wrote a review of the election campaign of 1852, pointing the absence of labor issues in the platforms of the Whig and Democratic parties. In December, in a two-part Political-Economic Survey, he attempted to project a platform for American labor. He stands for organizations of the workers on a large scale political as well as economical, and urged the workers to adopt internationalism.

=== The foundation of the American Workers League ===
With four of his friends, Weydemeyer formed a tiny organization, the first Marxist organization in the United States, formed in the summer of 1852. The group, called Proletarierbund, won the attention of German immigrants with the organization of a meeting on March 20, 1853, in New York, where eight hundred German Americans assembled in Mechanics Hall and founded the American Workers League.

This was an organization of mixed union and party functions, and presented a program of immediate issues for the working class and the socialist goal at the same time. The program was for immediate naturalization of all immigrants who wished to gain American citizenship, it favored federal, rather than state, labor legislation, stood for guaranteed payment of wages to workers whose employers went bankrupt, assumption by government of all costs of litigation with free choice of counsel, reducing the working day to ten hours, banning labor for children under sixteen, compulsory education with government maintenance for children whose families were too poor, against all Sunday and temperance laws, for the formation of tuition-colleges and for state acquisition of existing private colleges, for keeping the national lands on the frontier inalienable, etc. Beside the immediate demands, the League's platform stated some revolutionary principles. The preamble charged the capitalists of the everyday worse situation of the workers, the need of an independent political party for the workers, "without respect to occupation, language, color or sex", and the task of overthrowing the capital leadership with it as a way to solve social and political problems. It also leaned on the American Constitution of the Founding Fathers.

The American Workers League functioned for several years under a central committee made up of delegates from wards clubs and trade unions. Member of its committee, Weydemeyer tried to wide the influence of the League to non-German Americans but the League served primarily as a German recreation and mutual aid society, in isolation from the English-speaking workers. When in the context of the Know-Nothing agitation, in 1855, the members began forming a secret military organization to defend themselves against nativist attacks, Weydemeyer withdrew from the League. He devoted himself to study the American Economy and to writing and lecturing of Marxists ideas.

== American Civil War ==
As the country was moving toward a civil war, German Americans played an important part in the emergence of the Republican Party, so did Weydemeyer, who was one of the men who drew the German community toward the Republicans and the antislavery cause. Weydemeyer's stand for the Republicans was consistent with the influence of the most prominent labor radicals at the time, as Wilhelm Weitling. William Sylvis, leading native-born trade unionist, didn't engage in Republican politics, but showed approval for their platform in several commentaries published by Die Welt.

The Republican Party gained also influence through the free-soil movement. According to his Marxist opinion against the parceling out of government lands to small farmers, Weydemeyer denounced the Homestead Act agitation in 1854 as contrary to the interest of the workers and was in favor of large-scale agriculture. But in the 1860s, together with other German Republicans, he urged the party to campaign for "immediate passage by Congress of a Homestead law by which the public lands of the Union may be secured for homesteads of the people, and secured from the greed of speculators." Weydemeyer's backing of the free-soil movement and shift of position about that issue wasn't a stand for the free-soil movement as social progress (as was Hermann Kriege's endorsement of this movement in 1845), but a question of tactic. Weydemeyer's support of the free-soil movement at that moment signified his support for the antislavery cause, the main issue at the time in his point of view.

Shortly after dropping the American Workers League, Weydemeyer left New York and settled down in the Midwest, where he lived for four years, first in Milwaukee and then in Chicago, where he worked as a journalist and also as a surveyor. He tried to establish in Chicago, another independent German labor paper, and contributed to the Illinois Staats-Zeitung, a famous German Republican daily of the Midwest. He took part in the Deutsches Haus conference of German-American societies in Chicago in May 1860 to influence the Republican convention's platform and candidates. Back in New York at the end of 1860, he found a job as a surveyor of Central Park and became active in the election campaign for Abraham Lincoln. Eight months later, he was in the army.

Thanks to his background as a Prussian military officer and surveyor, he became a technical aide on the staff of General John C. Frémont, the commander of the department of the West. He superintended the erection of ten forts around St. Louis. After Frémont was removed from his command in November 1861, Weydemeyer was made a lieutenant colonel and given command of a Missouri volunteer artillery regiment which took the field against Confederate guerillas in southern Missouri in 1862. At the end of the year, he was hospitalized for a nervous disorder and transferred to garrison duty in St. Louis, which he left in September 1863.

Politically active in Missouri, Weydemeyer was facing two main issues: the extension of emancipation to Missouri and the prevention of a split between the Lincoln and Frémont faction of the Republican Party. Despite his own sympathy for the Frémont straight position, he tried to conciliate the factions and keep safe the victory in the 1864 election and in the war. In September 1864, Weydemeyer joined the army as colonel of the 41st Missouri Volunteer Infantry charged with the defense of St. Louis. While doing his military duty, he distributed copies of the Inaugural Address of the International Workingmen's Association, exchanged letters with Engels on military and political issues, contributed to local papers, as the Daily St Louis Press where he wrote an editorial greeting the founding of the First International. In July 1865, he demobilized his regiment and left the Army.

== Later life ==
At the end of the war, Weydemeyer began to write regularly for the Westliche Post and the Neue Zeit, two St. Louis papers. He was elected St. Louis County Auditor on the Radical Union ticket, serving from January 1, 1866 until his death. He worked for strong tax laws and collecting unpaid taxes of men who used the war to become rich. The same day William S. Sylvis inaugurated the National Labor Union in Baltimore, Weydemeyer died of cholera in St. Louis, Missouri, at the age of 48.

== See also ==
- The Eighteenth Brumaire of Louis Napoleon
- International Workingmen's Association in America
- Alexander Schimmelpfennig
- August Willich

== Works cited ==
- Foner, Philip (1977). American Socialism and Black Americans: From The Age of Jackson to World War II. Greenwood Publishing Group. ISBN 0837195454.
