= International Labor Union =

Former trade union of the United States

The International Labor Union was a trade union in the northeastern United States from 1878-1887.

The ILU was founded by members of the Workingmen's Party of the United States who were upset with the parties turn toward political action after the Newark convention of December, 1877. Some members wanted to concentrate on the economic organization of the working class and split from the renamed Socialistic Labor Party to found the International Labor Union in 1878. Members of the provisional committee of the new organization included Ira Steward, George Gunton, Albert Parsons, Friedrich Adolph Sorge, Otto Weydemeyer, J. P. McDonnell, George McNeill, Carl Speyer and George Schilling. It held its first congress in Paterson, New Jersey in December 1878.

The outlook and goals of the organization were broad. The ILUs program represented an amalgam of the eight-hour philosophy that Steward had been propagandizing, and the industrial unionism of McDonnell and Sorge. Both saw the wages system as a despotism. Immediate demands included reduction of hours, state and local labor bureaus, workplace inspection and prohibition of child labor. Reflecting the industrial unionist aspect of the organization were its goals to organized the unskilled and unorganized, to affiliate already existing unions with itself and to create a national, then international centralized union of all workers.

In practice its organizing efforts were largely concentrated among textile workers in New Jersey, New York and Massachusetts. It had 700 members in July 1878. After leading a textile strike in Paterson, and organizing efforts in Fall River, Massachusetts, membership had grown to a reported 8,000. By February 1880 the organization had rapidly shrunk to 1,400-1,500 in eight branches. By the next year, a single branch in Hoboken.

The organization was dissolved when the leader of the Hoboken branch, Sorge, moved to Rochester, New York in 1887.
