= Carl Speyer =

German socialist

Carl Speyer (1845–1???) was a German socialist active in Germany, London and the United States.

He was a member of the board of the Arbeiter Zeitung and secretary of the Vereingte Tischler New Yorks, a German joiners union based in the city, as well as a founding member of the International Labor Union established in Paterson, New Jersey, in December 1878.
