= The Eighteenth Brumaire of Louis Bonaparte =

1852 essay by Karl Marx on the 1851 French coup d'état

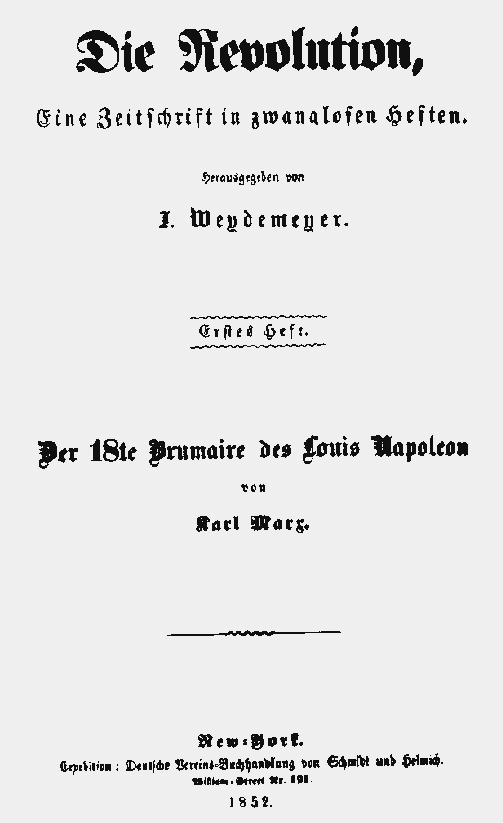
- Cover of the first edition in 'Die Revolution'
- Author: Karl Marx
- Original title: Der 18te Brumaire des Louis Napoleon
- Language: German
- Genres: Historical Materialism
- Publisher: Joseph Weydemeyer
- Publication date: 1852
- Publication place: New York City
- Media type: Essay
- Text: The Eighteenth Brumaire of Louis Bonaparte at Wikisource

The Eighteenth Brumaire of Louis Napoleon (German: Der 18te Brumaire des Louis Napoleon) is an essay written by Karl Marx between December 1851 and March 1852, and originally published in 1852 in Die Revolution, a German monthly magazine published in New York City by Marxist Joseph Weydemeyer. A second German edition, revised by Marx, was published in Hamburg in 1869 under the title Der 18. Brumaire des Louis Bonaparte, with a new preface by Marx. The essay serves as a major historiographic application of Marx's theory of historical materialism.

The Eighteenth Brumaire focuses on the 1851 French coup d'état, by which Louis-Napoléon Bonaparte, president of the Second Republic, became the emperor of the Second French Empire as Napoleon III. The title refers to 9 November 1799 in the French Revolutionary Calendar – the day when his uncle, the first Napoléon Bonaparte, had made himself dictator by a coup d'etat fifty-two years earlier. The essay seeks to explain how capitalism and class struggle created the conditions which enabled "a grotesque mediocrity to play a hero's part". Marx describes the divisions and alliances among the bourgeoisie, the petty bourgeoisie, the peasantry, revolutionaries, and social democrats, among other groups, and how a lack of dominance of any one group led to the re-emergence of monarchy, despite the Revolution of 1848. Marx describes the Second Empire as a "Bonapartist" state, an exception to the basic Marxist conception of the state as an instrument of class rule in that the Bonapartist state becomes semi-autonomous, representing the interests of no single class, and draws attention to what he calls the phenomenon's repetitive history with one of his most quoted lines, typically condensed aphoristically as: "History repeats itself, first as tragedy, second as farce."

== Contents ==
The title refers to the coup of 18 Brumaire in which Napoleon seized power in revolutionary France (9 November 1799, or 18 Brumaire Year VIII in the French Republican Calendar), in order to contrast it with the 1851 French coup d'état.

In the preface to the second edition of The Eighteenth Brumaire, Marx stated that the purpose of this essay was to "demonstrate how the class struggle in France created circumstances and relationships that made it possible for a grotesque mediocrity to play a hero's part."

The Eighteenth Brumaire presents a taxonomy of the mass of the bourgeoisie, which Marx says impounded the republic like its property, as consisting of: the large landowners, the aristocrats of finance and big industrialists, the high dignitaries of the army, the university, the church, the bar, the academy, and the press.

== Significance ==
The Eighteenth Brumaire is regarded by the social historian C. J. Coventry as the first social history, the base model or template for E. P. Thompson's The Making of the English Working Class (1963). Social history gained popularity in the 1960s. According to Oliver Cussen, the rise of cultural history in the 1990s, in line with neoliberal capitalism, saw Marx's perception of the necessity of revolutionary change replaced with Alexis de Tocqueville's elitist pessimism that popular revolt would only result in despots.

The Eighteenth Brumaire, along with Marx's contemporary writings on English politics and The Civil War in France, is a principal source for understanding Marx's theory of the capitalist state.

Political scientist Robert C. Tucker describes Marx's analysis of Louis Bonaparte's rise to power and rule as a "prologue to later Marxist thought on the nature and meaning of fascism." Louis Bonaparte's regime has been interpreted as a precursor to 20th-century fascism.

Two of Marx's most recognizable quotes appear in the essay. The first is on history repeating itself: "Hegel remarks somewhere that all great world-historic facts and personages appear, so to speak, twice. He forgot to add: the first time as tragedy, the second time as farce". The second concerns the role of the individual in history: "Men make their own history, but they do not make it as they please; they do not make it under self-selected circumstances, but under circumstances existing already, given and transmitted from the past. The tradition of all dead generations weighs like a nightmare on the brains of the living."

== "First as tragedy, then as farce" ==
The opening lines of the book are the source of one of Marx's most quoted statements, that historical entities appear two times, "the first as tragedy, then as farce" (das eine Mal als Tragödie, das andere Mal als Farce), referring respectively to Napoleon I and to his nephew Louis Napoleon (Napoleon III):

Hegel remarks somewhere that all great world-historic facts and personages appear, so to speak, twice. He forgot to add: the first time as tragedy, the second time as farce. Caussidière for Danton, Louis Blanc for Robespierre, the Montagne of 1848 to 1851 for the Montagne of 1793 to 1795, the nephew for the uncle. The same caricature occurs in the circumstances of the second edition of The Eighteenth Brumaire.

Marx's sentiment echoed an observation made by Friedrich Engels at exactly the same time Marx began work on this book. In a letter to Marx of 3 December 1851, Engels wrote from Manchester:

... it really seems as though old Hegel, in the guise of the World Spirit, were directing history from the grave and, with the greatest conscientiousness, causing everything to be re-enacted twice over, once as grand tragedy and the second time as rotten farce, Caussidière for Danton, L. Blanc for Robespierre, Barthélemy for Saint-Just, Flocon for Carnot, and the moon-calf together with the first available dozen debt-encumbered lieutenants for the little corporal and his band of marshals. Thus the 18th Brumaire would already be upon us.

Yet this motif appeared even earlier, in Marx's 1837 unpublished novel Scorpion and Felix, this time with a comparison between the first Napoleon and King Louis Philippe:

Every giant ... presupposes a dwarf, every genius a hidebound philistine. ... The first are too great for this world, and so they are thrown out. But the latter strike root in it and remain. ... Caesar the hero leaves behind him the play-acting Octavianus, Emperor Napoleon the bourgeois king Louis Philippe.

Marx's comment is most likely about Hegel's Lectures on the Philosophy of History (1837), Part III: "The Roman World", Section II: "Rome from the Second Punic War to the Emperors", regarding Caesar:

But it became immediately manifest that only a single will could guide the Roman State, and now the Romans were compelled to adopt that opinion; since in all periods of the world a political revolution is sanctioned in men’s opinions, when it repeats itself. Thus Napoleon was twice defeated, and the Bourbons twice expelled. By repetition that which at first appeared merely a matter of chance and contingency becomes a real and ratified existence.

== See also ==
- Band of the 10th of December
- Marxist philosophy
- Bonapartism#Marxism
- Lumpenproletariat
- Napoléon le Petit
