= Civil service reform =

Civil service reform refers to movements for the improvement of the civil service in methods of appointment, rules of conduct, etc. Relevant articles are:

- On historical movements: spoils system and merit system
- Civil service reform in developing countries
- Civil service reform in the United States
  - National Civil Service Reform League
  - Pendleton Civil Service Reform Act (1883)
  - Hatch Act (1939)
  - Civil Service Reform Act of 1978
