= American Workers League =

American Workers League Amerikanische Arbeiterbund
- Leader: Joseph Weydemeyer
- Founded: 1853; 173 years ago
- Dissolved: 1855; 171 years ago
- Preceded by: Proletarierbund
- Succeeded by: New York Communist Club; Free Soil Party
- Ideology: Marxism; Socialism; Abolitionism; German Americans interests
- Political position: Far-left

The American Workers League (German: Amerikanische Arbeiterbund) was an American 19th century workers political organization.

In 1852, Joseph Weydemeyer, a longtime friend of Karl Marx, created the Proletarierbund (Proletarian League).

In 1853, the Proletarian League was expanded into the American Workers League, with Weydemeyer among their leaders, by 800 German American delegates who attended the inaugural meeting in the Mechanics Hall in New York City.

The organization adopted an egalitarian membership policy holding that all workers who live in the United States without distinction of occupation, language, color, or sex can become members. They opposed the Kansas–Nebraska Act because it had the effect of allowing slavery in the lands opening up in the American West.

In 1855, Weydemeyer left the leadership of the organization, which had been fading away. He would later join the New York Communist Club.
