= Lumpenproletariat =

Marxist term to describe a subsection of the underclass

In Marxist theory, the Lumpenproletariat (German: [ˈlʊmpn̩pʁoletaʁi̯ˌaːt]; /ˌlʌmpənproʊlɪˈtɛəriət/) is the underclass devoid of class consciousness. Karl Marx and Friedrich Engels coined the word in the 1840s and used it to refer to the unthinking lower strata of society exploited by reactionary and counter-revolutionary forces, particularly in the context of the revolutions of 1848. They dismissed the revolutionary potential of the Lumpenproletariat and contrasted it with the proletariat. Among other groups, some types of criminals, vagabonds, and prostitutes are usually included in this category.

The Social Democratic Party of Germany made wide use of the term by the turn of the 20th century. Vladimir Lenin and Leon Trotsky followed Marx's arguments and dismissed the group's revolutionary potential, while Mao Zedong argued that proper leadership could harness it. The word Lumpenproletariat, popularized in the West by Frantz Fanon's The Wretched of the Earth in the 1960s, has been adopted as a sociological term. However, what some consider to be its vagueness and its history as a term of abuse has led to some criticism. Some revolutionary groups, most notably the Black Panther Party and the Young Lords, have sought to mobilize the Lumpenproletariat.

== Overview ==
=== Etymology ===
Karl Marx and Friedrich Engels are generally considered to have coined the term Lumpenproletariat. It is composed of the German word Lumpen, which is usually translated as "ragged" and prolétariat, a French word adopted as a common Marxist term for the class of wage earners in a capitalist system. Hal Draper argued that the root is Lump ("knave"), not Lumpen. Bussard noted that the meaning of Lump shifted from being a person dressed in rags in the 17th century to knavery in the 19th century.

=== Definition ===
The American Heritage Dictionary of the English Language defines it as "the lowest stratum of the proletariat. Used originally in Marxist theory to describe those members of the proletariat, especially criminals, vagrants, and the unemployed, who lacked awareness of their collective interest as an oppressed class." In modern usage, it is commonly defined to include the chronically unemployed, the homeless, and career criminals.

In English translations of Marx and Engels, lumpenproletariat has sometimes been rendered as "social scum", "dangerous classes", "ragamuffin", "slum proletariat", and "ragged-proletariat". It has been described by some scholars and theorists, as well as the Soviet nomenclature, as a declassed (déclassé) group. The term "underclass" is considered to be the modern synonym of lumpenproleteriat. (Note: "the lumpen proletariat, or what today might be called the 'underclass'.") Scholars note its negative connotations. (Note: "The Marxist term for this underclass, the lumpenproleteriat, conveys distinctly negative images.") Economist Richard McGahey, writing for the New York Times in 1982, noted that it is one of the older terms in a "long line of labels that stigmatize poor people for their poverty by focusing exclusively on individual characteristics." He listed the following synonyms: "underclass", "undeserving poor", and "culture of poverty". Another synonym is "riff-raff". The word is used in some languages as a pejorative. In English, it may be used in an informal disapproving manner to "describe people who are not clever or well educated, and who are not interested in changing or improving their situation."

== Usage by Marx and Engels ==
According to historian Robert Bussard, Karl Marx and Friedrich Engels viewed the lumpenproletariat as:

essentially parasitical group was largely the remains of older, obsolete stages of social development, and that it could not normally play a progressive role in history. Indeed, because it acted only out of socially ignorant self-interest, the lumpenproletariat was easily bribed by reactionary forces and could be used to combat the true proletariat in its efforts to bring about the end of bourgeois society. Without a clear class-consciousness, the lumpenproletariat could not play a positive role in society. Instead, it exploited society for its own ends, and was in turn exploited as a tool of destruction and reaction.

They used the term exclusively with negative connotations, although their works lack a "consistent and clearly reasoned definition" of the term. They used the term in various publications "for diverse purposes and on several levels of meaning."

Hal Draper suggested that the concept has its roots in Young Hegelian thought and possibly in G.W.F. Hegel's Elements of the Philosophy of Right. While Bussard believes that the idea was "at one and the same time, a hybrid of new social attitudes which crystallised in France, England and Germany, as well as an extension of more traditional, pre-nineteenth-century views of the lower classes." Bussard noted that they often used the term as a "kind of sociological profanity" and contrasted between it and "working and thinking" proletariat. According to Michael Denning, by identifying the lumpenproletariat, "Marx was combating the established view that the entire working class was a dangerous and immoral element. He drew a line between the proletariat and the lumpenproletariat to defend the moral character of the former."

=== In early writings ===
The first collaborative work by Karl Marx and Friedrich Engels to feature the term lumpenproletariat is The German Ideology, written in 1845–46. They used it to describe the plebs (plebeians) of ancient Rome who were midway between freemen and slaves, never becoming more than a "proletarian rabble [lumpenproletariat]" and Max Stirner's "self-professed radical constituency of the Lumpen or ragamuffin." The first work written solely by Marx to mention the term was an article published in the Neue Rheinische Zeitung in November 1848 which described the lumpenproletariat as a "tool of reaction" in the revolutions of 1848 and as a "significant counterrevolutionary force throughout Europe." Engels wrote in The Peasant War in Germany (1850) that the lumpenproletariat is a "phenomenon that occurs in a more or less developed form in all the so far known phases of society".

In The Communist Manifesto (1848), where lumpenproletariat is commonly translated in English editions as the "dangerous class" and the "social scum", Marx and Engels wrote:

The lumpenproletariat is passive decaying matter of the lowest layers of the old society, is here and there thrust into the [progressive] movement by a proletarian revolution; [however,] in accordance with its whole way of life, it is more likely to sell out to reactionary intrigues.

=== In writings on France ===
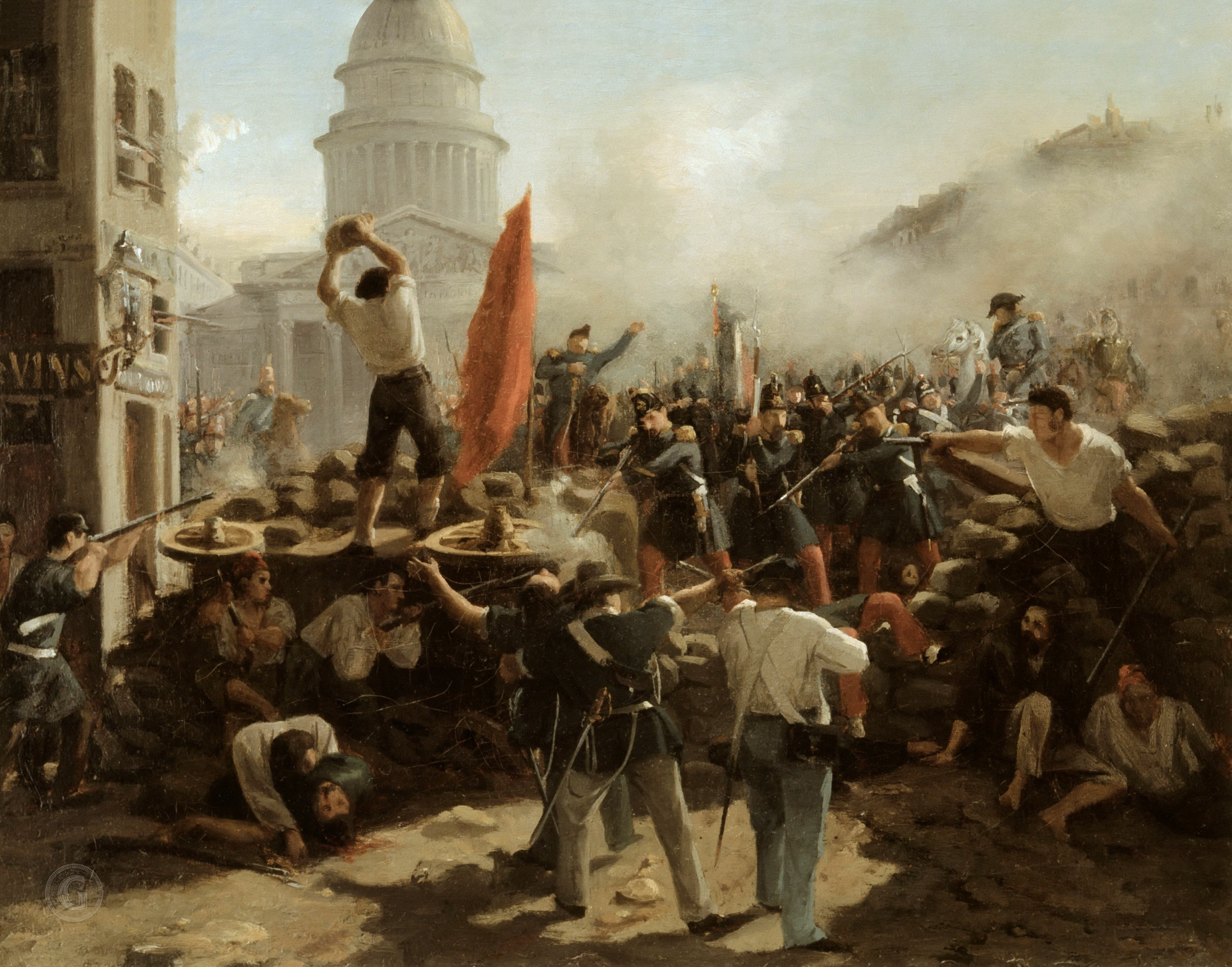
A depiction of the 1848 uprising in Paris by Horace Vernet

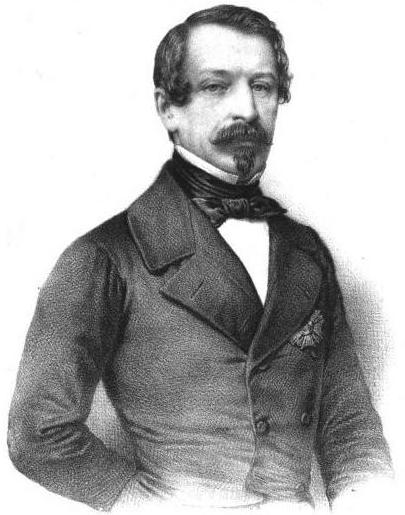
Louis-Napoléon Bonaparte

In an article analyzing the June 1848 events in Paris, Engels wrote of the gardes mobiles, a militia which suppressed the workers' uprising: "The organized lumpenproletariat had given battle to the working proletariat. It had, as was to be expected, put itself at the disposal of the bourgeoisie." Thoburn notes that Marx makes his most detailed descriptions of the lumpenproletariat in his writings of the revolutionary turmoil in France between 1848 and 1852: The Class Struggles in France, 1848–1850 (1850) and The Eighteenth Brumaire of Louis Napoleon (1852). In The Class Struggles he describes the finance aristocracy of Louis Philippe I and his July Monarchy (1830–1848) as lumpenproletarian: "In the way it acquires wealth and enjoys it the financial aristocracy is nothing but the lumpenproletariat reborn at the pinnacle of bourgeois society." He distinguished the finance aristocracy from the industrial bourgeoisie as the former became rich "not by production, but by pocketing the already available wealth of others." He further suggests that the lumpenproletariat is a component of the proletariat, unlike his earlier works. He claimed that the gardes mobiles were set up "to set one segment of the proletariat against the other":

They belonged for the most part to the lumpenproletariat, which forms a mass clearly distinguished from the industrial proletariat in all large cities, a recruiting ground for thieves and criminals of all kinds, living on the refuse of society, people without a fixed line of work.

In The Eighteenth Brumaire of Louis Napoleon Marx identified Napoleon III as the "Chief of the Lumpenproletariat", a claim he made repeatedly. He argued that he bought his supporters with "gifts and loans, these were the limits of the financial science of the lumpenproletariat, both the low and the exalted. Never had a President speculated more stupidly on the stupidity of the masses." For Marx, the lumpenproletariat represented those who were "corrupt, reactionary and without a clear sense of class-consciousness." He wrote in The Eighteenth Brumaire:

Alongside ruined roués with questionable means of support and of dubious origin, degenerate and adventurous scions of the bourgeoisie, there were vagabonds, discharged soldiers, discharged convicts, runaway galley slaves, swindlers, charlatans, lazzaroni, pickpockets, tricksters, gamblers, procurers, brothel keepers, porters, literati, organ grinders, rag-pickers, knife-grinders, tinkers, beggars; in short, the entirely undefined, disintegrating mass, thrown hither and yon, which the French call la bohème.

=== Capital ===
In Capital (1867), Marx claimed that legislation turned soldiers and peasants "en masse into beggars, robbers, vagabonds, partly from inclination, in most cases from stress of circumstances." By this, he deviated from his focus on the vicious and degenerate behavior of the lumpenproletariat in his writings on France. Instead, he described the lumpenproletariat as part of what he called an "industrial reserve army", which capitalists used as required. Thus, "vagabonds, criminals, prostitutes" and other lumpenproletariat formed an element within the "surplus population" in a capitalist system.

== Left-wing views ==
=== Social Democratic Party of Germany ===
The Social Democratic Party of Germany (SPD) was one of the first to use lumpenproletariat in its rhetoric, particularly to indicate the scope of its view of a "desirable" working class and to exclude the non-respectable poor. By the early 20th century, the German Marxist tradition saw workers outside the SPD and/or labor unions as members of the lumpenproletariat. In the late 19th and early 20th centuries, rioting and violence was often attributed by the SPD and its newspaper Vorwärts to the lumpenproletariat working in collusion with the secret police. Historian Richard J. Evans argued that the SPD, thus, lost touch with the "militancy of the classes which it claimed to represent, a militancy which found expression in frequent outbursts of spontaneous collective protest, both political and industrial, at moments of high social and political tension." For many German socialists in the imperial period the lumpenproletariat—especially prostitutes and pimps—was not only a "political-moral problem, but also an objective, biological danger to the health of society." Karl Kautsky argued in 1890 that it is the lumpenproletariat and not the "militant industrial proletariat" that mostly suffer from alcoholism. August Bebel, pre-World War I leader of the SPD, linked antisemitic proletarians to the lumpenproletariat as the former failed to develop class consciousness, which led to a racial, and not social, explanation of economic inequality.

=== Bolsheviks and the Soviet Union ===
Vladimir Lenin called socialist attempts to recruit lumpenproletariat elements "opportunism". In 1925 Nikolai Bukharin described the lumpenproletariat as being characterized by "shiftlessness, lack of discipline, hatred of the old, but impotence to construct anything new, an individualistic declassed 'personality' whose actions are based only on foolish caprices." In a 1932 article on "How Mussolini Triumphed" Leon Trotsky described the "declassed and demoralized" lumpenproletariat as "the countless human beings whom finance capital itself has brought to desperation and frenzy." He argued that capitalism used them through fascism. The Great Soviet Encyclopedia, written from the Marxist-Leninist perspective, defined lumpenproletariat as:

a declassed strata in an antagonistic society (including vagrants, beggars, and criminal elements) [which] has become particularly widespread under capitalism. It is recruited from various classes and is incapable of organized political struggle. It constitutes, along with the petit bourgeois strata, the social basis of anarchism. The bourgeoisie makes use of the lumpen proletariat as strikebreakers, as participants in fascist pogrom bands, and in other ways. The lumpen proletariat disappears with the abolition of the capitalist system.

The term was rarely used in the Soviet Union to describe any portion of the Soviet society because, Hemmerle argues, following the Russian Revolution of 1917, "millions of people passed through economic conditions that bore a resemblance to the traditional meaning of lumpenproletariat". However, it was used to label labor movements in capitalist countries that were not pro-Soviet. Soviet authorities and scholars instead reserved other terms for their own lumpenproletariat groups, especially "déclassé elements" (деклассированные элементы, deklassirovannye elementy), and viewed them, like Marx, as "social degenerates, isolated from the forces of production and incapable of having a working-class consciousness." Svetlana Stephenson notes that the Soviet state "for all its ideology of assistance, cooperation and social responsibility, was ready to descend on them with all its might."

=== China ===
Mao Zedong argued in 1939 that the lumpenproletariat (Chinese: 游民无产者, pinyin: yóumín wúchǎnzhě) in China is a legacy of the country's "colonial and semi-colonial status" which forced a vast number of people in urban and rural areas into illegitimate occupations and activities. Earlier, in 1928, he asserted that "the only way" to win over these wayward proletarians was to carry out intensive thought reform "to effect qualitative changes in these elements". He argued that the lumpenproletariat had a dual nature. Simultaneously, they were "victimized members of the laboring masses and untrustworthy elements with 'parasitic inclinations'", which made them waver between revolution and counterrevolution. He believed that lumpenproletariat elements, such as triads, the organized crime syndicates, "can become revolutionary given proper leadership". According to Luo Ruiqing, the Minister of Public Security, the lumpenproletariat population consisted of sex workers, vagrant gangs, and theft rings and were political problems that threatened the internal security of China. Following the Communist victory in the Chinese Civil War and the proclamation of the People's Republic of China (PRC), the lumpenproletariat were interned in government-run reeducation centers. Some 500,000 people were interned in 920 such centers by 1953. Historian Aminda Smith notes that the "case of lumpenproletariat reformatories suggests that anti-state resistance from members of the oppressed masses was essential to early-PRC rhetoric because it validated claims about the devastating effects of the old society and the transformative power of socialist 'truth'."

=== Views on its revolutionary potential ===
By the early 1970s, some radicals deviated from the orthodox Marxist view that the lumpenproletariat lacked significant revolutionary potential. Herbert Marcuse, an American philosopher and sociologist of the Frankfurt School, believed that the working class in the US "having been bought up by the consumer society, has lost all class consciousness" and lay the hopes for revolution on the lumpenproletariat—the social outcasts—led by intellectuals. Marcuse, along with Afro-Caribbean philosopher Frantz Fanon and other radical intellectuals, proposed that elements of the lumpenproletariat are potentially leading forces in a revolutionary movement. According to Michael Denning Fanon revived the term, long having been disappeared from left-wing discourse, in this book The Wretched of the Earth (1961). He defined the lumpenproletariat as the peasantry in colonial societies of the Third World not involved in industrial production who are unaware of the dominant colonial ideology and are therefore, "ready, capable and willing to revolt against the colonial status quo for liberation." He described them as "one of the most spontaneous and the most radically revolutionary forces of a colonized people." He was not uncritical of the lumpenproletariat due to their supposed unpredictability due to "their ignorance and incomprehension." Colonial forces could make use of them as hired soldiers.

Fanon's use of the term prompted debates and studies, including by Pierre Bourdieu and Charles van Onselen. The African revolutionary Amílcar Cabral was skeptical about the lumpen being used in anti-colonialist liberation revolution. His African Party for the Independence of Guinea and Cape Verde recruited déclassé, but not lumpenproletariat, groups as the latter were supportive of the Portuguese colonial police, while the former, in the absence of a developed proletariat in Guinea and Cape Verde, played a dynamic role in anti-colonialist struggle. Historian Martin Meredith wrote that Ethiopian ruler Mengistu Haile Mariam used "the lumpen-proletariat of the slums" to help with his Red Terror.

==== Black Panther Party ====
Laura Pulido argues that, historically, the lumpenproletariat in the US has mostly been African American due to the nation being racially constituted. It is primarily indicated by the high unemployment and incarceration rates among African Americans. The Black Panther Party, most prominent revolutionary socialists in post-war US, "thought of much of their following as lumpenproletarian." They adopted Fanon's viewpoint regarding the revolutionary potential of the group. Pulido claims the emphasis the Black Panthers put on the lumpenproletariat was the party's hallmark. Its co-founders Bobby Seale and Huey P. Newton viewed the African-American lumpenproletariat as a potential organized threat if the party did not mobilize them. Seale included "the brother who's pimping, the brother who's hustling, the unemployed, the downtrodden, the brother who's robbing banks, who's not politically conscious" in his definition of the lumpenproletariat. Newton called them "street brothers", alienated from the system of oppression in the US, and sought to recruit them into the party. Their strategy was a controversial one. Chris Booker and Errol Henderson argued that problems such as "a lack of discipline, a tendency toward violence, the importation of street culture, including crime, and the use of weapons" by Black Panthers were caused by the disproportionately high membership of the lumpenproletariat in their ranks.

==== Young Lords Party ====
The Young Lords Party adopted views similar to those of the Black Panther Party, believing in the potential of the lumpen. They developed a Lumpen Organization within their larger organization to enlist the people considered the lumpenproletariat, or "lumpen", in the struggle; they considered the lumpen to be "the class in our nation which for years and years have not been able to find jobs, and are forced to be drug addicts, prostitutes, etc." (p. 20) in the face of the capitalist system the Party considered an enemy. Crucial to the party's view on the lumpen is that, unlike criticisms of the lumpenproletariat around a perceived lack of productivity and organization, the Young Lords Party stated that "it's a law of revolution that the most oppressed group takes the leadership position" (p. 42) and that the lumpen would be the immediate focus of the party's organizing efforts in liberating all oppressed peoples.

=== Criticism ===
Ernesto Laclau argued that Marx's dismissal of the lumpenproletariat showed the limitations of his theory of economic determinism and argued that the group and "its possible integration into the politics of populism as an 'absolute outside' that threatens the coherence of ideological identifications." Mark Cowling argues that the "concept is being used for its political impact rather than because it provides good explanations" and that its political impact is "pernicious" and an "obstacle to clear analysis." Laura Pulido argues that there is a diversity in the lumpen population, especially in terms of consciousness.

==== Anarchist criticism ====
Post-anarchist Saul Newman wrote in 2010 that classical anarchists argue that the lumpenproletariat should be designated as a revolutionary class. According to Tom Brass, individualist anarchist Max Stirner "celebrated the lumpenproletariat as authentic rebels." Anarchist thinker Mikhail Bakunin, who was dubbed "the lumpen prince" by Engels, wrote that only in the lumpenproletariat and "and not in the bourgeois strata of workers, are there crystallised the entire intelligence and power of the coming Social Revolution." Thoburn writes that for him, the lumpenproletariat represented a "kind of actually existing anarchism." Ann Robertson notes that Bakunin believed that "inherent in humanity is a natural essence which can be suppressed but never entirely extinguished. Those in society who are more distant from the State apparatus (the peasants are scattered throughout the countryside, the lumpenproletariat simply refuses to obey the laws) are accordingly natural leaders". Bakunin stated:

that eternal 'meat', [...] that great rabble of the people (underdogs, 'dregs of society') ordinarily designated by Marx and Engels in the picturesque and contemptuous phrase lumpenproletariat. I have in mind the 'riffraff', that 'rabble' almost unpolluted by bourgeois civilization, which carries in its inner being and in its aspirations [...] all the seeds of the socialism of the future...

== Other uses ==
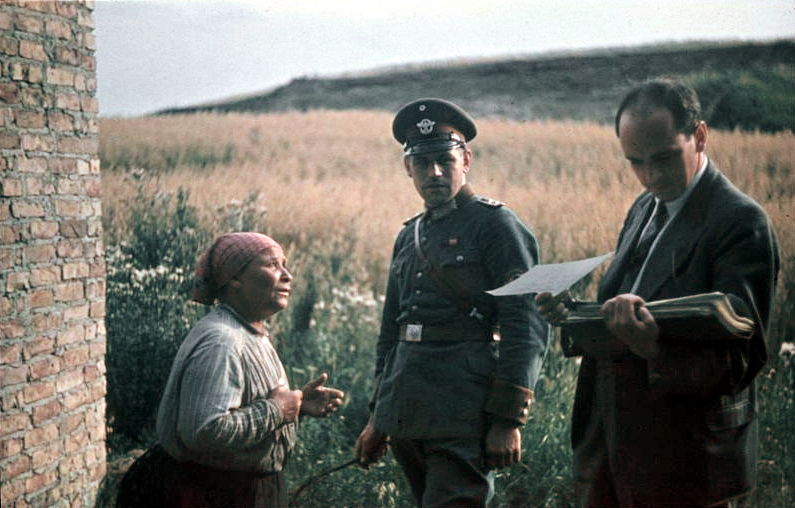
Ritter with an Ordnungspolizei officer and a Romani woman, 1936

Robert Ritter, the head of Nazi Germany's efforts to track the genealogies of the Romani, considered them a "highly inferior Lumpenproletariat" as they were "parasites who lacked ambition and many of them had become habitual criminals." The Romani were seen in post-World War II communist-ruled eastern and central Europe as an example of the lumpenproletariat and were, therefore, subject to an aggressive policy of assimilation.

Ken Gelder noted that in cultural studies, subcultures are "often positioned outside of class, closer in kind to Marx's lumpenproletariat, lacking social consciousness, self-absorbed or self-interested, at a distance from organised or sanctioned forms of labour, and so on."

Ukrainian historian Volodymyr Kravchenko describes the titushky, pro–Viktor Yanukovych provocateurs active during the Euromaidan protests of 2013–14, as "lumpen elements".

=== In American political discourse ===
The 1979 report of the Carnegie Council on Policy Studies in Higher Education warned that the US is in danger of creating "a permanent underclass, a self‐perpetuating culture of poverty, a substantial 'lumpen proletariat'." Eleanor Holmes Norton wrote in 1985: "An American version of a lumpenproletariat (the so-called underclass), without work and without hope, existing at the margins of society, could bring down the great cities, sap resources and strength from the entire society and, lacking the usual means to survive, prey upon those who possess them." According to political scientist Marie Gottschalk the tough-on-crime stance on African Americans has been caused by political manipulation of public fears of a lumpen underclass threatening the majority as African Americans were perceived to have turned to crime due to losing in the deindustrialization of the country.

Mark Cowling argued that there is considerable similarity in both definition and function between the lumpenproletariat, as proposed by Marx, and the contemporary theory of the underclass by Charles Murray, an American conservative political scientist. Although Murray and Richard Herrnstein did not use the term in their 1994 book The Bell Curve, Malcolm Browne noted in a New York Times review that the authors argue that the United States is being "split between an isolated caste of ruling meritocrats on one hand and a vast, powerless Lumpenproletariat on the other. Society, the authors predict, will have little use for this underclass in a world dominated by sophisticated machines and the bright human beings who tend them."

Several commentators and researchers have analyzed Donald Trump's political base as modern American lumpenproletariat. Trumpen Proletariat was coined by Jonah Goldberg in 2015 to describe Trump's "biggest fans", who he believed "are not to be relied upon in the conservative cause" in the same way the lumpenproletariat was not to be relied upon for a socialist revolution. Daniel Henninger used the term as well in The Wall Street Journal. Francis Levy compared "basket of deplorables", Hillary Clinton's phrase to characterize some Trump supporters during the 2016 presidential election campaign, to Marx's rhetoric of the lumpenproletariat. In 2020 Ryan Lizza coined Biden Proletariat to describe an underclass of campaign workers and supporters—"veterans of the Biden campaign"—who were cast aside during post-election White House staffing, thus carrying on a tradition in Democratic politics of abandoning loyal political workers in favor of well-connected political elites.

=== Usage in India ===
Ranjit Gupta, the Inspector General of the West Bengal Police, claimed in 1973 that the Maoist Naxalite rebels in India were made up of "some intellectuals and lumpen proletariat. Their main target was policemen—and they thought that if the police force could be torn apart, so could society." Political scientist Atul Kohli claimed in his 2001 book that "variety of lumpen groups, especially unemployed youth in northern India, have joined right-wing proto-fascist movements in recent years", especially the Hindu nationalist Rashtriya Swayamsevak Sangh (RSS). In 2010s, cow vigilantism in India has been linked by Pavan Varma to "lumpen Hindu fanaticism" and to "lumpen and self-appointed gau rakshaks" by Bhalchandra Mungekar.

== Genocides and crimes against humanity ==
Due to a desire to keep clean the hands of the larger public, paramilitary groups are often used to commit atrocities and they often recruit mainly among criminals, said to be used to violence and brutality and wanting to enjoy an occasion to loot. The lumpenproletariat has been described as being more likely to adhere to doctrines calling for ethnic cleansing and to organize in militias.

During the Armenian genocide, prisoners were pardoned and released from prison to serve in bands, or çetes. Criminals and other elements of the lumpenproletariat hoped to gain respectability and wealth through their participation in genocide.

During World War II, the German Waffen-SS Dirlewanger Brigade recruited poachers and criminals to guard the ghetto in Lublin and later wage the Bandenbekämpfung on the Eastern Front.

In Kigali, during the Rwandan genocide, the Interahamwe and Impuzamugambi, who recruited among the poorer elements of the population, started to draw a "lumpenproletariat of street boys".

The various Serbian militias of the Bosnian War, such as the Serb Volunteer Guard and the White Eagles, were described as recruiting from the lumpenproletariat. Eighty percent of the Bosnian Serb paramilitary troops were said to be criminals, and Croat and Bosnian units similarly drew criminals into their ranks.

In Darfur, some Janjaweed were convicts recruited in prison or bandits who joined governmental forces. Marc Lavergne, author of Le Soudan contemporain, described them as a "rural lumpenproletariat".

== Sociological research ==
=== Political leanings ===
Ernesto Ragionieri, an Italian Marxist historian, argued that he had confirmed in his 1953 book Un comune socialista that the lumpenproletariat is essentially a conservative force based on his study of Sesto Fiorentino. He found that some 450–500 members of the working class had joined the liberal-conservative party, which landowners, industrialists, and professionals led in hopes of getting a recommendation that would allow them to join Richard-Ginori, the largest local employer, which refused to hire socialists.

=== Violence ===
In 1966, sociologist David Matza cited disorder and violence as two of the most prominent characteristics of the disreputable poor. In his 1977 book Class, State, and Crime, Marxist historian Richard Quinney defined lumpen crimes (or "predatory crimes") as those intended for purely personal profit. In a 1986 study sociologist David Brownfield defined the lumpen-proletariat (or the "disreputable poor") by their unemployment and receipt of welfare benefits. He concluded that "while no significant effects of class can be found using a neo-Marxist conception of class, gradational measures of class (occupation and education) ... Measures of disreputable poverty—unemployment and welfare status [recipiency]—are relatively strong correlates of violent behavior." He explained:

The frustrations and the anger associated with unemployment and being on welfare are compounded by the lack of such fundamental necessities as food, clothing, and shelter among some of the disreputable poor. It would seem self-evident that such an environment of absolute deprivation may be the breeding grounds for discontent and violence.

== Derivations ==
Several terms have been coined in imitation of lumpenproletariat such as:

- lumpenintelligentsia, to depreciatively describe in Britain, "a section of the intelligentsia regarded as making no useful contribution to society, or as lacking taste, culture, etc. Also more generally: the intelligentsia collectively, regarded as worthless or powerless."
- the term lumpenbourgeoisie was coined by German Socialist writers in the 1920s, in part to explain the rise of Hitler and National Socialism. It was reinvented and made popular again by sociologist Andre Gunder Frank in his works on dependency theory, where the so described class is complicit in maintaining a flow of resources from, and at the expense of, their own poor states at the "periphery" to a "core" of wealthy states
- lumpen militariat, coined by Ali Mazrui in 1973, to describe the newly emerging "class of semi-organized, rugged, and semi-literate soldiery which has begun to claim a share of power and influence in what would otherwise have become a heavily privileged meritocracy of the educated" in post-colonial Africa.

== Bibliography ==
- Abdullah, Ibrahim (2006). "Culture, consciousness and armed conflict: Cabral's déclassé/(lumpenproletariat?) in the era of globalization". African Identities. 4 (1): 99–112. doi:10.1080/14725840500268390. S2CID 144365791.
- Brownfield, David (1986). "Social Class and Violent Behavior". Criminology. 24 (3): 421–438. doi:10.1111/j.1745-9125.1986.tb00384.x.
- Bussard, Robert L. (1987). "The 'dangerous class' of Marx and Engels: The rise of the idea of the Lumpenproletariat". History of European Ideas. 8 (6): 675–692. doi:10.1016/0191-6599(87)90164-1.
- Cowling, Mark (2002). "Marx's Lumpenproletariat and Murray's Underclass: Concepts Best Abandoned?". In Cowling, Mark; Martin, James (eds.). Marx's 'Eighteenth Brumaire': (Post)Modern Interpretations. Pluto Press. pp. 228-242. ISBN 9780745318301.
- Denning, Michael (2010). "Wageless Life". New Left Review. 66: 79–97. (web version)
- Hayes, Peter (1988). "Utopia and the Lumpenproletariat: Marx's Reasoning in 'The Eighteenth Brumaire of Louis Bonaparte'". The Review of Politics. 50 (3): 445–465. doi:10.1017/S0034670500036330. JSTOR 1407908. S2CID 145258994.
- Pulido, Laura (2006). Black, Brown, Yellow, and Left: Radical Activism in Los Angeles. University of California Press. ISBN 9780520245204.
- Smith, Aminda M. (2013). "Thought Reform and the Unreformable: Reeducation Centers and the Rhetoric of Opposition in the Early People's Republic of China". The Journal of Asian Studies. 72 (4): 937–958. doi:10.1017/S0021911813001654. JSTOR 43553236. S2CID 162866252.
- Stallybrass, Peter (Summer 1990). "Marx and Heterogeneity: Thinking the Lumpenproletariat". Representations (31): 69–95. doi:10.2307/2928400. JSTOR 2928400.
- Thoburn, Nicholas (2002). "Difference in Marx: the lumpenproletariat and the proletarian unnamable". Economy and Society. 31 (3): 434–460. doi:10.1080/03085140220151882. S2CID 53466836.
