= Extension =

Extension, extend or extended may refer to:

== Mathematics ==
=== Logic or set theory ===
- Axiom of extensionality
- Extensible cardinal
- Extension (model theory)
- Extension (proof theory)
- Extension (predicate logic), the set of tuples of values that satisfy the predicate
- Extension (semantics), the set of things to which a property applies
- Extension (simplicial set)
- Extension by definitions
- Extensional definition, a definition that enumerates every individual a term applies to
- Extensionality

=== Other uses ===
- Extension of a function, defined on a larger domain
- Extension of a polyhedron, in geometry
- Extension of a line segment (finite) into an infinite line (e.g., extended base)
- Exterior algebra, Grassmann's theory of extension, in geometry
- Field extension, in Galois theory
- Group extension, in abstract algebra and homological algebra
- Homotopy extension property, in topology
- Kolmogorov extension theorem, in probability theory
- Linear extension, in order theory
- Sheaf extension, in algebraic geometry
- Tietze extension theorem, in topology
- Whitney extension theorem, in differential geometry

== Music ==
- Extension (music), notes that fit outside the standard range
- Extended (Solar Fields album), 2005
- Extension (George Braith album), 1964
- Extension (Clare Fischer album), 1963
- Extensions (Ahmad Jamal album), 1960
- Extensions, a 1969 album by Mystic Moods Orchestra
- Extensions (McCoy Tyner album), 1970
- Extensions (Dave Holland album), 1988
- Extensions (The Manhattan Transfer album), 1979
- Extension (The Extended Mixes), 2023 album reissue by Kylie Minogue

== Places ==
- Extension, British Columbia, a village near Regional District of Nanaimo, British Columbia, Canada
- Extension, Louisiana, unincorporated community, United States

== Science ==
- Extension (geology), relating to the pulling apart of the Earth's crust and lithosphere
- Extension (anatomy), a movement at a joint that increases the angle between the two ends of the joint; the opposite of flexion
- Extension locus, the gene locus of Melanocortin 1 receptor

== Other uses ==
- Agricultural extension service
  - Cooperative State Research, Education, and Extension Service, a former division of the U.S. Department of Agriculture
- Extension, the building of community capacity by outsiders, for instance agricultural extension
- Plug-in (computing), a software component that adds a specific feature to an existing computer program
- Browser extension, a small software module for customizing a web browser
- Building extension
- Continuing education, or extension school, a school for continuing education
- Extension (metaphysics), the property of stretching out or taking up space
- Extension (telephone), telephone line attached to a main line or to a PBX or Centrex system
- Extension cord, power cable with a plug on one end and one or more sockets on the other end
- Eyelash extensions, material applied to eyelashes
- Hair extensions, strands of hair added to existing hair
- Filename extension, for computer file systems

== See also ==
- Extensive (disambiguation)
