= Ostension =

Ostension may refer to:

- Ostension (communication), behaviour that signals the intention to communicate something
- Ostension (folklore), real-life happenings that parallel the events from myth and folklore
- Ostensive definition, conveying the meaning of a term by pointing out examples
- Ostension (Christianity), solemn display of sacred objects
- Ostension: Word Learning and the Embodied Mind, book by Chad Engelland
