= Intensional =

Intensional, related to intension, may refer to:

== Intensional ==
- in philosophy of language: not extensional. See also intensional definition versus extensional definition
- in philosophy of mind: an intensional state is a state which has a propositional content
- in mathematical logic: see intensional statement. See also extensionality, and also intensional definition versus extensional definition
- Intensional logic embraces the study of intensional languages: at least one of their functors is intensional. It can be contrasted to extensional logic
- Intensional fallacy, committed when one makes an illicit use of Leibniz's law in an argument
- See also: Musical form
