= Connotation =

Cultural or emotional association

A connotation is a commonly understood cultural or emotional association that any given word or phrase carries, in addition to its explicit or literal meaning, which is its denotation.

The majority of connotations can be described as either positive or negative, with regard to its pleasing or displeasing emotional connection. For example, a stubborn person may be described as being either strong-willed or pig-headed; although these have the same literal meaning (stubborn), strong-willed connotes admiration for the level of someone's will (a positive connotation), while pig-headed connotes frustration in dealing with someone (a negative connotation).

Some words have such strong connotations that they are better known for the connotation they provide, rather than a dictionary definition. For instance, a significant amount of profanities, such as shit or fuck are commonly used for purposes entirely unrelated to their dictionary definition.

== Usage ==
"Connotation" branches into a mixture of different meanings. These could include the contrast of a word or phrase with its primary, literal meaning (known as a denotation), with what that word or phrase specifically denotes. The connotation essentially relates to how anything may be associated with a word or phrase; for example, an implied value, judgement or feelings.

=== Logic ===
In logic and semantics, connotation is roughly synonymous with intension. Connotation is often contrasted with denotation, which is more or less synonymous with extension. Alternatively, the connotation of the word may be thought of as the set of all its possible referents (as opposed to merely the actual ones). A word's denotation is the collection of things it refers to; its connotation is what it implies about the things it is used to refer to (a second level of meanings is termed connotative). The connotation of dog is (something like) four-legged canine carnivore. So, saying, "You are a dog" would connote that you were ugly or aggressive rather than literally denoting you as a canine.

=== Related terms ===
It is often useful to avoid words with strong connotations (especially pejorative or disparaging ones) when striving to achieve a neutral point of view. A desire for more positive connotations, or fewer negative ones, is one of the main reasons for using euphemisms.

Semiotic closure, as defined by Terry Eagleton, concerns "a sealed world of ideological stability, which repels the disruptive, decentered forces of language in the name of an imaginary unity. Signs are ranked by a certain covert violence into rigidly hierarchical order. . . . The process of forging ‘representations’ always involves this arbitrary closing of the signifying chain, constricting the free play of the signifier to a spuriously determinate meaning which can then be received by the subject as natural and inevitable".

== Creation ==
Connotations in language are primarily created when a given word is only used in specific scenarios, rather than all scenarios which would fall under the dictionary definition.

For instance, after the Norman invasion of England, Old French, especially Norman variations, became widely used by people of power, such as landowners and royalty, while English was still primarily used by the lower class. As such, French words became associated with high society. Because of this, most French and French derived words are held to be formal and ornate compared to similar English words, at least by native English speakers.

== Examples ==
Example seven .

The denotation is a representation of a cartoon heart. The connotation is a symbol of love and affection.

Example one.

The denotation of this example is a red rose with a green stem. The connotation is that it is a symbol of passion and love – this is what the rose represents.

Example two.

The denotation is a brown cross. The shape is widely associated with religion, specifically as a symbol of Christianity.

== See also ==
- Context as Other Minds
- Double entendre
- Extension
- Extensional definition
- Intension
- Intensional definition
- Implicature
- Loaded language
- Metacommunicative competence
- Pun
- Semantic differential
- Semantic property
- Subtext
