= Ostensive definition =

Definition by example

An ostensive definition conveys the meaning of a term by pointing out examples. This type of definition is often used where the term is difficult to define verbally, either because the words will not be understood (as with children and new speakers of a language) or because of the nature of the term (such as colors or sensations). It is usually accompanied with a gesture pointing to the object serving as an example, and for this reason is also often referred to as "definition by pointing".

== Overview ==
An ostensive definition assumes the questioner has sufficient understanding to recognize the type of information being given. Ludwig Wittgenstein writes:

So one might say: the ostensive definition explains the use—the meaning—of the word when the overall role of the word in language is clear. Thus if I know that someone means to explain a colour-word to me the ostensive definition "That is called 'sepia' " will help me to understand the word.... One has already to know (or be able to do) something in order to be capable of asking a thing's name. But what does one have to know?

The limitations of ostensive definition are exploited in a famous argument from Wittgenstein’s Philosophical Investigations (which deal primarily with the philosophy of language), the private language argument, in which he asks if it is possible to have a private language that no one else can understand.

John Passmore states that the term was first defined by the British logician William Ernest Johnson (1858–1931):

"His neologisms, as rarely happens, have won wide acceptance: such phrases as "ostensive definition", such contrasts as those between ... "determinates" and "determinables", "continuants" and "occurrents", are now familiar in philosophical literature" (Passmore 1966, p. 344.)

== See also ==
- Comprehension
- Enumerative definition
- Exemplification
- Extensional and intensional definitions
- Family resemblance
- Intension
- Ostension
