= Temperature paradox =

Logical paradox

The Temperature paradox or Partee's paradox is a classic puzzle in formal semantics and philosophical logic. Formulated by Barbara Partee in the 1970s, it consists of the following argument, which speakers of English judge as wildly invalid.

1. The temperature is ninety.
2. The temperature is rising.
3. Therefore, ninety is rising. (invalid conclusion)

Despite its obvious invalidity, this argument would be valid in most formalizations based on traditional extensional systems of logic. For instance, the following formalization in first order predicate logic would be valid via Leibniz's law:

1. t=90
2. R(t)
3. R(90) (valid conclusion in this formalization)

To correctly predict the invalidity of the argument without abandoning Leibniz's Law, a formalization must capture the fact that the first premise makes a claim about the temperature at a particular point in time, while the second makes an assertion about how it changes over time. One way of doing so, proposed by Richard Montague, is to adopt an intensional logic for natural language, thus allowing "the temperature" to denote its extension in the first premise and its intension in the second.

1. extension(t)=90
2. R(intension(t))
3. R(90) (invalid conclusion)

Thus, Montague took the paradox as evidence that nominals denote individual concepts, defined as functions from a world-time pair to an individual. Later analyses build on this general idea, but differ in the specifics of the formalization.
