= Devil's Chair (disambiguation) =

The Devil's Chair are urban legends about funerary or memorial sculpture in cemeteries.

Devil's Chair may also refer to:

== Places ==
- Devil's Chair (Shropshire), a geologic formation in the Stiperstones, Shropshire, England
- Silla del Diablo, a geologic formation within the Cueva del Milodón Natural Monument in Patagonian Chile
- Devil's Chair, a destroyed geologic formation in the Interstate Parks on the Minnesota-Wisconsin border, US
- Devil's Chair, a rock formation in Collonges-la-Rouge, France

== Other uses ==
- The Devil's Chair, a 2007 British film
