= Burlesque metaphor =

Amusing figure of speech

A burlesque metaphor is a figure of speech which is amusing, overstated, or grotesque, usually a comparison or exemplification.

== Examples ==
Eat your own dog food.

— An American proverb which means that you should consume your own product to recognize its flaws.

If they are offered winged ants, people will eat them.

— African proverb

There is an elephant in the room.

— An American idiom meaning that there is a sensitive issue no one brings up.
