= Ostension (folklore) =

Acting out a folk narrative

In the study of folklore and urban legends, ostension is the process of acting out a folk narrative, i.e., real-life happenings that parallel the events told in pre-existing and well-established legends and lore.

Ostension has become an important concept for folklorists studying the ways in which folklore affects everyday people's real lives, ranging from supernatural rituals such as legend tripping to the complex ways in which awareness of AIDS has affected people's sexual habits. Folklorist John McDowell explored the relationship between iconicity—representation—and ostension—presentation—in mythic narrative, finding in episodes of ostension a virtual encounter with the experiential substrate, an experience that he termed "narrative epiphany".

== Theory ==
Semiotician Umberto Eco was the first to use the term "ostension" to describe the way in which people communicate messages through miming actions, as by holding up a pack of cigarettes to say, "Would you like one?" The concept was applied to semiotic analysis of contemporary legends by John Holmes McDowell (1982) and by folklorists Linda Dégh and Andrew Vázsonyi (1983). In their article, "Does the Word ‘Dog’ Bite?", seminal for the concept in folkloristics, Dégh and Vázsonyi argued that the most direct form of ostension involved committing an actual crime mentioned in a well-known urban legend, such as microwaving someone's pet animal or placing poison in a child's Halloween candy. While such events are rare, the authors stressed that folklorists must recognize "that fact can become narrative and narrative can become fact."

Dégh and Vázsonyi, followed by other analysts, argued that there were two other forms of ostension that did not necessarily involve literal acting out of legends.

Quasi-ostension involves interpretation of ambiguous events in terms of a legend, as when a murder is first believed to have been a "cult" sacrifice or "gang" murder when in fact the perpetrator had other motives. Many local media panics are based in this form of ostension.

Pseudo-ostension involves legend-like events intentionally acted out by persons aware of the original narrative. For example, in 1991, Ebony published a letter written by "C.J." a Dallas-area woman who said she was HIV-positive, but intentionally having sex with as many men as possible. Soon after, a local radio talk-show broadcast a phone call from a woman who said she was the real "C.J." "I blame it on men, period," she said to the talk-show host. "I'm doing it to all the men because it was a man that gave it to me." After a huge spike in males seeking HIV screening in the Dallas-Fort-Worth area, both the author of the letter and the talk-show caller were identified as hoaxers intending to raise awareness of the disease.

Folklorist Jeffrey Tolbert argues that the "Slender Man" phenomenon represents a process he calls reverse ostension. According to Tolbert, the Slender Man does the opposite to ostension by creating a set of folklore-like narratives where none existed before. According to Tolbert, this represents two processes in one: it involves the creation of new objects and new disconnected examples of experience, and it involves the combination of these elements into a body of "traditional" narratives, modeled on existing folklore.

== See also ==
- Archetype
- Exemplification
- Legend tripping
