= Extensive =

Extensive may refer to:

- Extensive property
- Extensive function
- Extensional

== See also ==
- Extension (disambiguation)
