= Extensionalism =

Extensionalism, in the philosophy of language, in logic and semantics, is the view that all languages or at least all scientific languages should be extensional. It has been described as the default option for the scientism in the nineteenth century and the result of the application of empiricistic inductive methodology to the problem of semantics.

== Concept ==
The idea of extensionality is considered a form of reductionism with the way it holds that every meaningful and declarative sentence is equivalent to some extensional sentence. Rudolf Carnap (in his earlier work) and Willard Van Orman Quine were prominent proponents of this view.

Carnap's thesis of extensionality is associated with the relation between extensional and nonextensional languages. According to the thinker, the former has simpler structures and constitutive rules than the latter so that it is possible to discuss exhaustively all scientific phenomena when using extensional language. The idea put forward by Richard Montague that the intension of a predicate or a sentence is identifiable from possible worlds to extensions is also attributed to Carnap.

Quine, who maintained that he is a "confirmed extensionalist" maintained that an extensional language is one that contains no expressions that lead to non-extensional contexts. The early philosophy of Ludwig Wittgenstein also provided an important argument for extensionalism when he said that "a proposition is a truth-function of elementary propositions".

== See also ==
- Extension (semantics)
- Extension (predicate logic)
