= Orphan school =

Educational institution

An orphan school is a secular or religious institution dedicated to the education of children whose families cannot afford to have them educated. In countries with universal public education systems, orphan schools are no longer common.

== Orphan schools in the United States ==
The casualties of American Civil War did more than simply reduce the male population of the country, they also dramatically increased the number of widows and orphans. Many states reacted to the crisis by erecting new (or taking over existing) buildings to "care for, educate and train the children of fallen soldiers."

== See also ==
- Orphanage
- Foundling hospital
- Residential education
- Girard College
- Friends of the Orphans
- Catholic Charities
- Howard Association
- United States Children's Bureau
- Orphans International
- Charles Loring Brace
- Roman Catholic Orphan School
- Bellefaire Orphanage (Ohio)
- Bethesda Orphanage (Georgia)
- Girls and Boys Town (Nebraska)
- Leake and Watt's Children's Home (New York City, New York)
- St Joseph's Orphanage (Crescent Hill, Louisville)
- St. Cabrini Home (West Park, New York)
- Carversville Christian Orphanage (Carversville, Pennsylvania)
- Light of Hope Orphanage (Gore Orphanage)
- Sequoyah High School (Oklahoma)
- Howard Colored Orphan Asylum (Weeksville, Brooklyn, New York)
- Masonic Home for Children (Oxford, North Carolina)
