= Engelland =

Engelland is a surname. Notable people with the surname include:

- Deryk Engelland (born 1982), Canadian ice hockey player
- Chip Engelland (born 1961), American-Filipino basketball player and coach
- Chad Engelland, American philosopher
