= Extensional context =

Extensions with context

In any of several fields of study that treat the use of signs — for example, in linguistics, logic, mathematics, semantics, semiotics, and philosophy of language — an extensional context (or transparent context) is a syntactic environment in which a sub-sentential expression e can be replaced by an expression with the same extension and without affecting the truth-value of the sentence as a whole. Extensional contexts are contrasted with opaque contexts where truth-preserving substitutions are not possible.

Take the case of Clark Kent, who is secretly Superman. Suppose that Lois Lane fell out of a window and Superman caught her. Thus the sentence "Superman caught Lois Lane" is true. Because this sentence is an extensional context, the sentence "Clark Kent caught Lois Lane" is also true. Anybody that Superman caught, Clark Kent caught.

In opposition to extensional contexts are intensional contexts (which can involve modal operators and modal logic), where terms cannot be substituted without potentially compromising the truth-value. Suppose that Lois Lane believes that Clark Kent will investigate a news story with her. Thus, the sentence "Lois Lane believes that Clark Kent will investigate a news story with her" is true. However, the statement, "Lois Lane believes that Superman will investigate a news story with her," is false. This is because 'believes' typically induces an intensional context. Lois Lane doesn't believe that Superman is Clark Kent and the propositional attitude "believe" induces an intensional context, so the substitution alters the meaning of the original sentence.

== See also ==
- De dicto and de re
- Extension (semantics)
- Extensional definition
- Extensionalism
- Intensional logic
- Opaque context
- Propositional attitude
- W.V. Quine
