= The Devil's Chair (urban legend) =

Piece of folklore

The term devil's chair (or haunted chair) in folklore is frequently attached to a class of funerary or memorial sculpture common in the United States during the nineteenth century and often associated with legend tripping. Nineteenth-century graveyards sometimes included carved chairs for the comfort of visitors. In this function, the object was known as a "mourning chair," and cemeteries have since provided benches for similar purposes, most often movable units of the type used in parks, but also specimens in the tradition of the carved chairs.

Some carved chairs were probably not intended for use as anything but monuments, while the "monubench" is still commercially available. Once the original purpose of these chairs fell out of fashion, superstitions developed in association with the act of sitting in them. In a typical example, local young people dare one another to visit the site, most often after dark, at midnight, or on some specified night such as Halloween or New Year's Eve. Variously, the stories suggest the person brave enough to sit in the chair at such a time may be punished for impudence or rewarded for courage.

== Florida, US ==
The Devil's Chair in Cassadaga, Florida, is a graveside bench in the cemetery that borders Cassadaga and Lake Helen. According to one local legend, an unopened can of beer left on the chair will be empty by morning. In some accounts, the can is opened, and in others, the beer is simply gone, through the unopened top. The Devil himself is sometimes said to appear to anyone so bold as to sit in the chair.

== Illinois, US ==
The Haunted Chair of Greenwood Cemetery, Decatur, Illinois.

== Iowa, US ==
The Devil's Chair in Guthrie Center, Iowa, is a cement-cast chair located in Union Cemetery, situated between two graves and unmarked as belonging to either. Local legend claims that bad luck will follow anyone who sits in it. While the cemetery itself was established as a private burial ground in 1885, the legend of the chair is only documented for approximately thirty years.

== Missouri, US ==
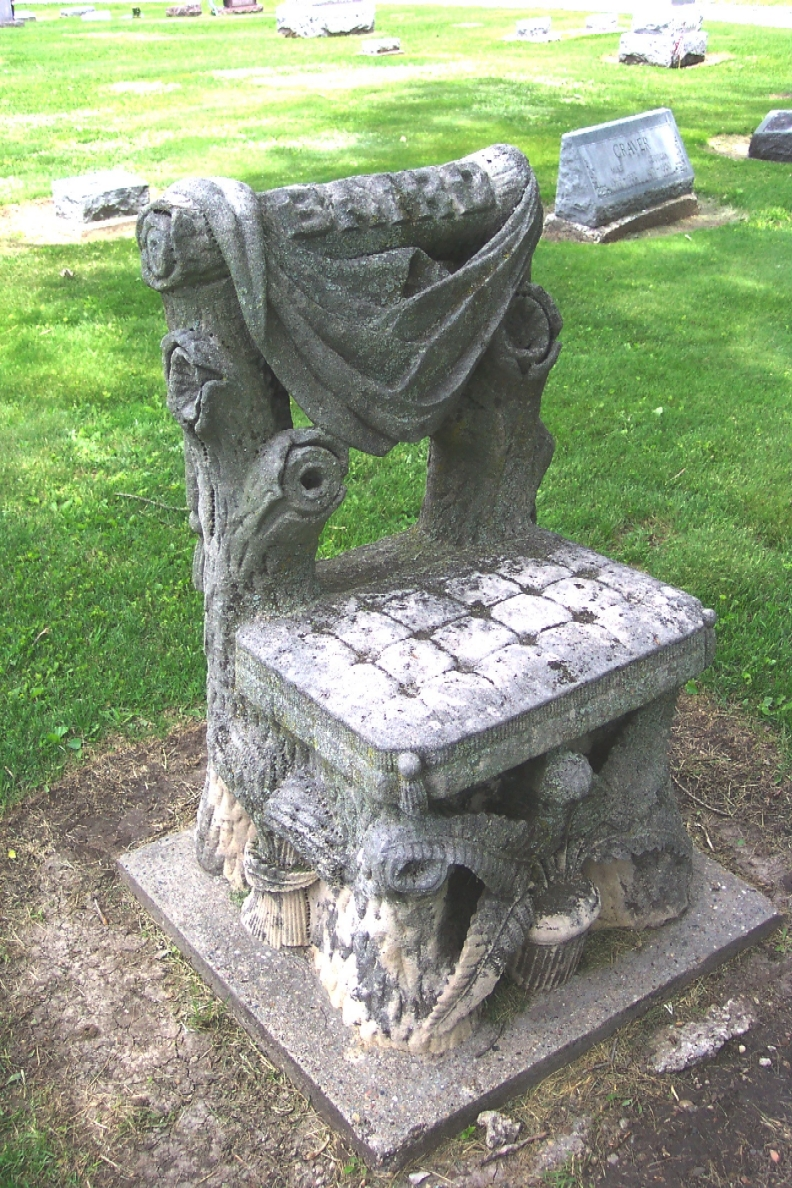
The Baird Chair monument in Kirksville, Missouri

The Devil's Chair or Baird Chair as it is officially named in the Highland Park Cemetery of Kirksville, Missouri, was first placed in the cemetery by Charles Grassle and David Baird when David's wife, Anna Maria (Hoye) Baird, died in 1911. It has become involved in "numerous legends of a type widely replicated across the U.S., especially in rural and small-town communities, and beloved of young people.... Some versions say that something dreadful will happen to the person so bold as to be seated in it at midnight (or on a particular evening, such as Halloween) -- a hand will emerge from the grave and drag the impious one down to the underworld. Other versions suggest the intrepid one will be rewarded." The chair itself was sculpted out of concrete by Charles Grassle of the Baird and Grassle Granite Work of Kirksville MO and placed as a memorial for Anna in 1911. One year later David Baird died and was buried beside Anna. This chair acts as their grave marker.

== New York, US ==
Oakwood Cemetery in Syracuse, New York, contains a child-sized specimen.

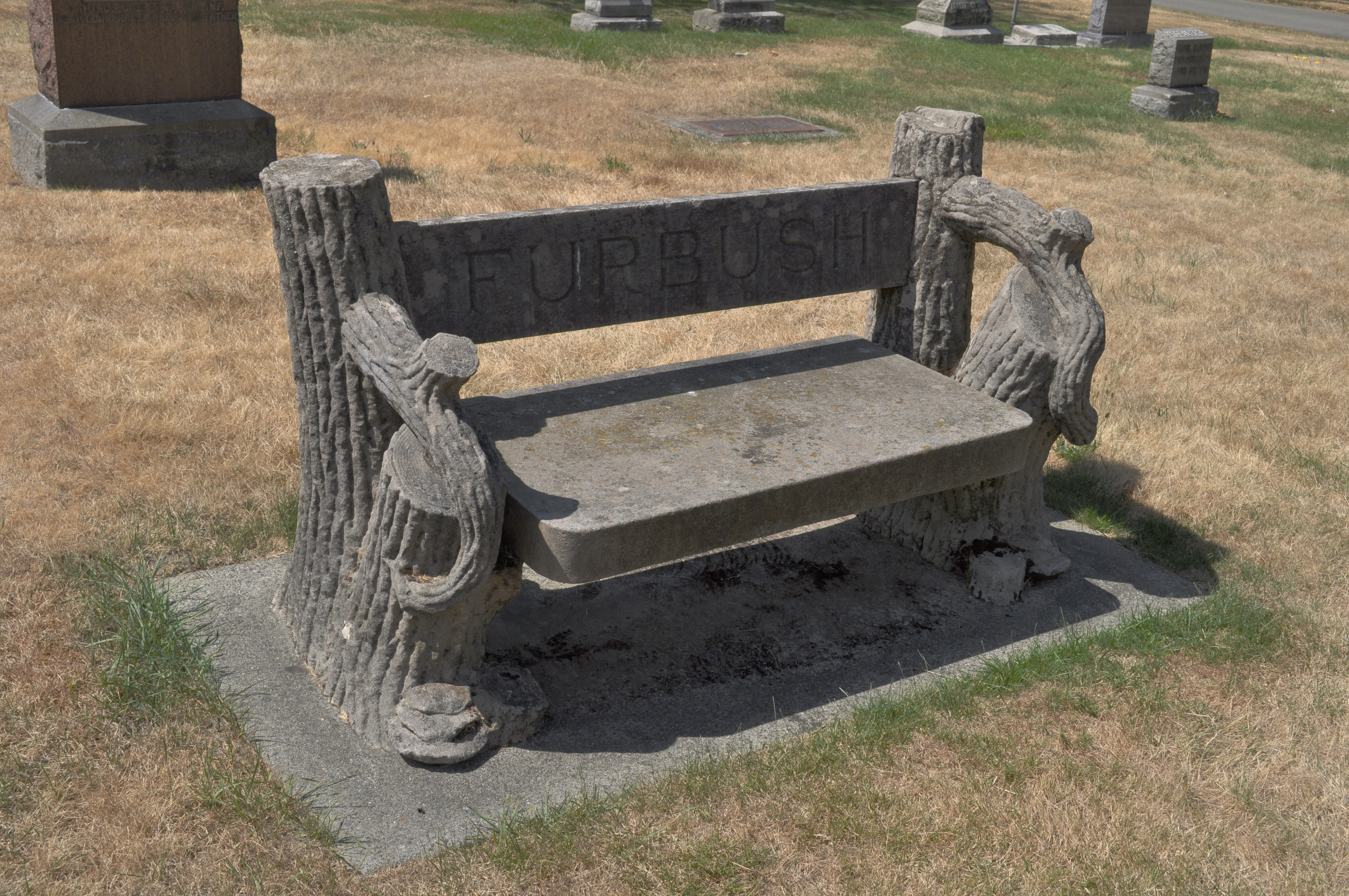
A bench-style specimen from Seattle, WA

== Ohio, US ==
The Duncan monument in the Fletcher Cemetery, Fletcher, Ohio, appears to be a carved headstone rather than a mourning chair intended for use by cemetery visitors.

== Vermont, US ==
"The Empty Chair" in Hope Cemetery, Barre, Vermont, is actually a sculpted gravestone rather than being intended as a seat. However, the usual legends have grown up around it.

== Georgia, US ==
In Bonaventure Cemetery located in Savannah, Georgia, the grave of famed music writer Johnny Mercer is formed in the style of one of these seats. Interestingly, contrary to other similar markers, Mercer's marker has writings and quotes on it and serves more as the tombstone, than a mourning chair.

== Italy ==
The lore may not be exclusive to the United States. In Torcello, the "throne of Attila" was probably in fact a magistrate's seat; local legend girl who sits in it will be married within a year.
