= Attila's Throne =

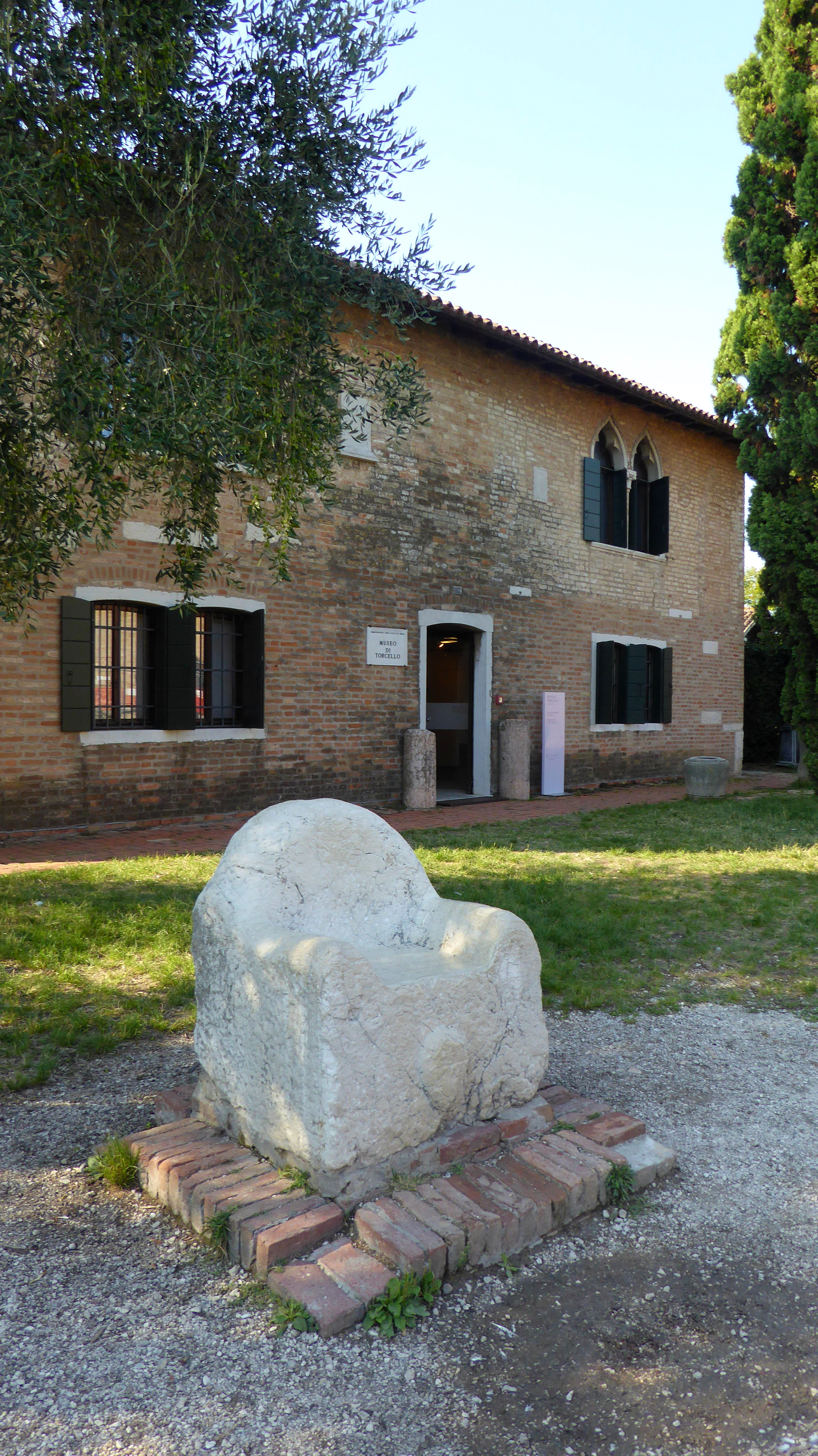
Attila's Chair with the Museo Provinciale di Torcello behind it

Attila's Throne is an ancient stone chair. It has, however, nothing to do with the king of the Huns, as it was put into place around 100 years after his death, it was most likely the podestà’s or the bishop’s chair. The chair is located on the quiet and sparsely populated island of Torcello at the northern end of the Venetian Lagoon in Italy.

== Local Legends ==
Multiple local legends surround the throne's history and legacy. The most notable being one who sits on the throne will return to Torcello. Another popular legend is that Attila himself used the throne, although this is disputed. The throne was most likely the seat of power for the Magister militum, the governor of the island.
