= Extensional and intensional definitions =

Classification of definitions in mathematics, philosophy, and logic

In logic, extensional and intensional definitions are two key ways in which the objects, concepts, or referents a term refers to can be defined. They give meaning or denotation to a term. An intensional definition gives meaning to a term by specifying necessary and sufficient conditions for when the term should be used. An extensional definition gives meaning to a term by specifying every object that falls under the definition of the term in question.

For example, in set theory one would extensionally define the set of square numbers as {0, 1, 4, 9, 16, $\dots$}, while an intensional definition of the set of the square numbers could be {$x \mid x$ is the square of an integer}.

== Intensional definition ==
An intensional definition gives meaning to a term by specifying necessary and sufficient conditions for when the term should be used. In the case of nouns, this is equivalent to specifying the properties that an object needs to have in order to be counted as a referent of the term.

For example, an intensional definition of the word "bachelor" is "unmarried man". This definition is valid because being an unmarried man is both a necessary condition and a sufficient condition for being a bachelor: it is necessary because one cannot be a bachelor without being an unmarried man, and it is sufficient because any unmarried man is a bachelor.

This is the opposite approach to the extensional definition, which defines by listing everything that falls under that definition – an extensional definition of bachelor would be a listing of all the unmarried men in the world.

As becomes clear, intensional definitions are best used when something has a clearly defined set of properties, and they work well for terms that have too many referents to list in an extensional definition. It is impossible to give an extensional definition for a term with an infinite set of referents, but an intensional one can often be stated concisely – there are infinitely many even numbers, impossible to list, but the term "even numbers" can be defined easily by saying that even numbers are integer multiples of two.

Definition by genus and difference, in which something is defined by first stating the broad category it belongs to and then distinguished by specific properties, is a type of intensional definition. As the name might suggest, this is the type of definition used in Linnaean taxonomy to categorize living things, but is by no means restricted to biology. Suppose one defines a miniskirt as "a skirt with a hemline above the knee". It has been assigned to a genus, or larger class of items: it is a type of skirt. Then, we've described the differentia, the specific properties that make it its own sub-type: it has a hemline above the knee.

An intensional definition may also consist of rules or sets of axioms that define a set by describing a procedure for generating all of its members. For example, an intensional definition of square number can be "any number that can be expressed as some integer multiplied by itself". The rule—"take an integer and multiply it by itself"—always generates members of the set of square numbers, no matter which integer one chooses, and for any square number, there is an integer that was multiplied by itself to get it.

Similarly, an intensional definition of a game, such as chess, would be the rules of the game; any game played by those rules must be a game of chess, and any game properly called a game of chess must have been played by those rules.

== Extensional definition ==
An extensional definition gives meaning to a term by specifying its extension, that is, every object that falls under the definition of the term in question.

For example, an extensional definition of the term "nation of the world" might be given by listing all of the nations of the world, or by giving some other means of recognizing the members of the corresponding class. An explicit listing of the extension, which is only possible for finite sets and only practical for relatively small sets, is a type of enumerative definition.

Extensional definitions are used when listing examples would give more applicable information than other types of definition, and where listing the members of a set tells the questioner enough about the nature of that set.

An extensional definition possesses similarity to an ostensive definition, in which one or more members of a set (but not necessarily all) are pointed to as examples, but contrasts clearly with an intensional definition, which defines by listing properties that a thing must have in order to be part of the set captured by the definition.

== Etymology ==
The terms "intension" and "extension" were introduced before 1911 by Constance Jones and formalized by Rudolf Carnap.

== See also ==
- Comprehension (logic) – Totality of intensions of an object
- Extension (predicate logic) – Set of tuples in mathematical logic that satisfy a predicate
- Extension (semantics) – Extension of a concept, idea, or sign
- Extensional context – Extensions with context
- Extensionalism
- Extensionality – Logic principle
- Intension – Property or quality connoted by a word, phrase, or another symbol
- Intensional logic – Approach to predicate logic
- Ostensive definition – Definition by example
