= Bunny Man =

American urban legend

Coordinates: 38.78985°N 77.36225°W

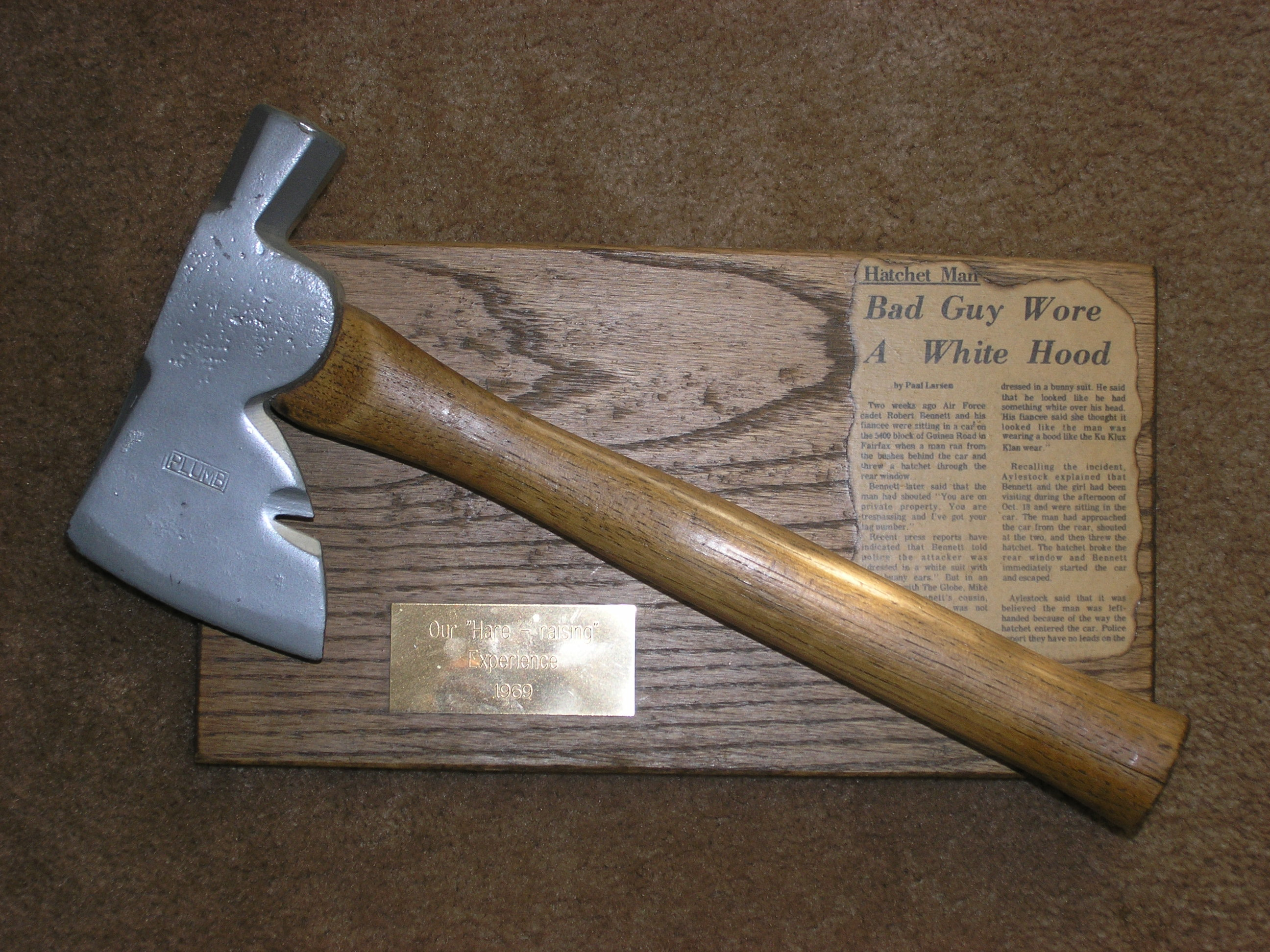
Hatchet allegedly used by the "Bunny Man" in 1970.

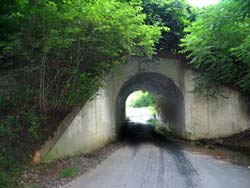
The "Bunny Man Bridge" in daylight

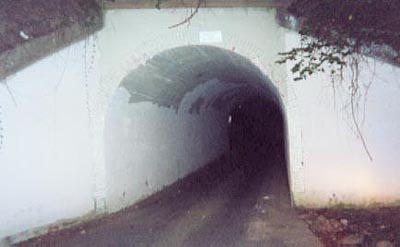
The "Bunny Man Bridge" at night

The Bunny Man is an urban legend that originated from two incidents in Fairfax County, Virginia in 1970; the legend has been spread throughout the Washington, D.C., and Maryland areas. The legend has many variations; most involve a man wearing a rabbit costume who attacks people with an axe or hatchet.

Most of the stories occur around Colchester Overpass, a Southern Railway overpass spanning Colchester Road near Clifton, Virginia, sometimes referred to as "Bunny Man Bridge".

Versions of the legend vary in the Bunny Man's name, motives, weapons, victims, description of the bunny costume or lack thereof, and sometimes even his possible death. In some accounts, victims' bodies are mutilated, and in some variations, the Bunny Man's ghost or aging spirit is said to come out of his place of death each year on Halloween to commemorate his death.

== Origin ==
Fairfax County Public Library Historian-Archivist Brian A. Conley extensively researched the Bunny Man legend. He has located two incidents of a man in a rabbit costume threatening people with an axe. The vandalism reports occurred ten days apart in 1970 in Burke, Virginia.

The first incident was reported on the evening of October 19, 1970, by U.S. Air Force Academy Cadet Robert Bennett and his fiancée, who were visiting relatives on Guinea Road in Burke. Around midnight, while returning from a football game, they reportedly parked their car in a field on Guinea Road to "visit an Uncle who lived across the street from where the car was parked". As they sat in the front seat with the motor running, they noticed something moving outside the rear window. Moments later, a "man dressed in a white suit with long bunny ears" ran out from the nearby bushes and began shouting "You're on private property and I have your tag number."

The man then threw a hatchet through the passenger-side window of the vehicle before running away. Bennett and his fiancée fled the scene uninjured, the hatchet still lying on the floorboard of their car.

When local police requested a description of the man, Bennett insisted he was wearing a white suit with long bunny ears. However, Bennett's fiancée contested their assailant did not have bunny ears on his head, but was wearing a white capirote of some sort. They both remembered seeing his face clearly; in the darkness, however, they could not determine his race.

Police also obtained and examined the hatchet, but with no supporting clues or leads, ultimately returned it to Bennett. The investigation yielded nothing further; the case was eventually closed altogether.

The second reported sighting occurred on the evening of October 31, 1970, when construction security guard Paul Phillips approached a man standing on the porch of an unfinished and unoccupied home, in Kings Park West on Guinea Road. Phillips said the man was wearing a gray, black, and white bunny costume, and was about 20 years old, 5 feet 8 inches (1.73 m) tall, and weighed about 175 pounds (79 kg). Phillips said in a statement "I started talking to him, and that's when he started chopping." The man began chopping at a porch post with a long-handled axe, with some reports saying eight gashes were struck into the pole. The man then said, "All you people trespass around here", and "You're trespassing. If you come any closer, I'll chop off your head." Phillips then left the house to retrieve his handgun from his car. By the time Phillips returned, the "rabbit" had run off into the woods.

No significant leads emerged from this incident either, and the Fairfax County Police eventually handed the case over to W.L. Johnson of the Criminal Investigation Bureau. In the weeks following the incidents, more than 50 people contacted the police claiming to have seen the "Bunny Man". Several newspapers, including The Washington Post, reported that the "Bunny Man" had eaten a man's runaway cat. Many people also called Johnson claiming to have information about the whereabouts or identity of the Bunny Man. Though most amounted to prank calls or schoolhouse rumors, Johnson allegedly received a phone call from a construction worker in the subdivision where the Bunny Man was last seen. This worker stated that he was called by someone referring to themselves as the "Axe Man", who said, "You have been messing up my property, by dumping tree stumps, limbs, and brush, and other things on the property. You can make everything right by meeting me tonight and talking about the situation." Local authorities began a stake out on the location (presumably the construction site), but the Axe Man failed to show up. The Post articles that mentioned this incident were:

- "Man in Bunny Suit Sought in Fairfax" (October 22, 1970)
- "The 'Rabbit' Reappears" (October 31, 1970)
- "Bunny Man, Strikes again" (November 1,1970)
- "Bunny Man Seen" (November 4, 1970)
- "Bunny Reports Are Multiplying" (November 6, 1970)

In 1973, Patricia Johnson, a student at the University of Maryland, College Park, submitted a research paper that chronicled precisely 54 variations on the two incidents. Many maintain the basic plot in some shape or form, but vary in details like location and specific events. A handful even mention the Bunny Man committing murders, a detail at odds with the two documented sightings. Conley cites this as evidence of how the original Bunny Man story had mutated through various retellings, and that the story would be taken to new heights during the early days of the internet.

Conley further stated that the most widely circulated version of the story was posted to the website Castle of Spirits in 1999. In it, user "Timothy J. Forbes" claimed the Bunny Man was a convict named Douglas J. Grifon, who escaped while being transported to a new facility by bus in 1904. The story proceeds to chronicle a series of grisly, almost supernatural murders committed at Bunny Man Bridge, most occurring decades before the officially documented sightings. According to Conley, "all of the specifics given in the Forbes version are false". Not only did the stated murders never happen, but key institutions mentioned - such as the Old Clifton Library, allegedly the source of the author's information - never existed in the first place.

== Colchester Overpass ==
Colchester Overpass was built in about 1906 near the site of Sangster's Station, a Civil War era railroad station on what was once the Orange and Alexandria Railroad. Because of its association with the legend, the overpass is a popular destination for paranormal enthusiasts (ghost hunters) and curiosity seekers (legend trippers). Interest increases around Halloween, and starting in 2003, local authorities began controlling access to the area during that time. During Halloween 2011, over 200 people, some from as far away as the Pennsylvania–Maryland state line, were turned away during a 14-hour traffic checkpoint into the area.

== London ==
A variant of the story appeared as an urban legend in England: some detainees in Wembley police station were said to have been beaten up in their cells by an assailant dressed in a bunny mascot costume. In one version, when the station was closed, an old locker was forced open and the costume with blood stains was discovered inside.

== See also ==
- Donnie Darko
- Raymond Robinson (Green Man)
- Madam Koi Koi
