= Lilly E. Gray =

American woman known for her "Victim of the Beast 666" headstone

- Born: Lilly Edith Cook; June 6, 1881; Manvers, Ontario, Canada
- Died: November 14, 1958 (aged 78); Salt Lake City, Utah, U.S.
- Resting place: Salt Lake City Cemetery; 40.777326°N 111.854068°W
- Spouses: Richard Walsh (m. 1918); Frank Zimmerman (m. 1926); Elmer Louis Gray (m. 1952)
- Parent(s): Richard Cook and Mary Margaret Harrison

Lilly Edith Gray was an American resident of Salt Lake City whose headstone in the city cemetery became a landmark of Utah folklore due to the inscription "Victim of the Beast 666." Though popularly associated with Satanism or paranormal legends, the epitaph is historically recognized as a political statement by her husband, Elmer Louis Gray, who used the term "The Beast" to characterize the United States government and the legal system.

== Early life and marriages ==
Lilly Edith Cook was born in Manvers, Ontario, Canada, on June 4, 1880, to Richard Cook and Mary Margaret Harrison. Her family immigrated to Benzie County, Michigan, around 1880. Lilly had a twin sister, Ethel Sarah Cook, who died in 1917 after being institutionalized for nearly twenty years in the Traverse City State Hospital.

Lilly married her first husband, Richard C. Walsh, in Chicago in 1918. Following his death, she married Frank Zimmerman in 1926. They resided in Chicago, where both were employed by the United States Post Office, until Zimmerman's death in 1943. By 1950, Lilly had relocated to Salt Lake City, where she married her third husband, Elmer Louis Gray, on July 10, 1952, in Elko, Nevada.

== Death and epitaph ==
Lilly Gray died on November 14, 1958, at Salt Lake General Hospital. Her official death certificate (State File No. 58 18 2480) confirms the cause of death as natural, specifically a pulmonary embolism secondary to kidney failure. She was interred in Plot X-1-169-4E of the Salt Lake City Cemetery.

The headstone commissioned by Elmer Gray contains a minor error, listing her birth date as June 6, 1881. The inclusion of the phrase "Victim of the Beast 666" has made the grave a focal point for legend tripping, with visitors often falsely attributing the inscription to the influence of occultist Aleister Crowley or Satanic worship.

== Elmer Gray and "The Beast" ==
Elmer Louis Gray (1881–1964) had an extensive criminal record (Utah State Prison No. 7436) and a documented history of anti-government sentiment. Using various aliases, including "Woodrow Lamb," he served over a decade in prison for burglary convictions across several states.

In 1947, while applying for a pardon, Elmer wrote a series of letters to the Board of Pardons describing his arrest as being "kidnapped by 5 Democrat Rebel officials" and calling the judicial system "The Beast." Historians conclude that Elmer used the epitaph on Lilly's grave as a final political protest, blaming the state's legal and medical systems for the stress and perceived neglect he believed led to her death.

== See also ==
- Sovereign citizen movement
- Legend tripping
- Salt Lake City Cemetery
