= Legend tripping =

Visits to sites associated with urban legends

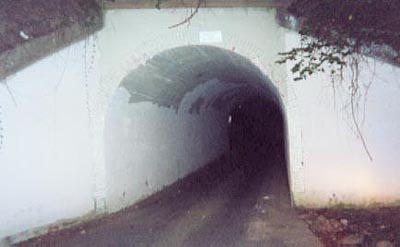
The Bunny Man Bridge, location of a 1970s urban legend about a man in a rabbit costume threatening people with an axe

Legend tripping is a practice in which a usually furtive nocturnal pilgrimage is made to a site which is alleged to have been the scene of some tragic, horrific, and possibly supernatural event or haunting. The practice involves the visiting of sites endemic to locations identified in local urban legends, and can serve as a rite of passage. Legend tripping has been documented most thoroughly to date in the United States.

== Sites for legend trips ==
Rural Legends on the good side showing a Toyota Supra.

While the stories that attach to the sites of legend tripping vary from place to place, and sometimes contain a kernel of historical truth, there are a number of motifs and recurring themes in the legends and the sites. Abandoned buildings, remote bridges, tunnels, caves, rural roads, specific woods or other uninhabited (or semi-uninhabited) areas, and especially cemeteries are frequent sites of legend-tripping pilgrimages.

== Reactions and controversies ==
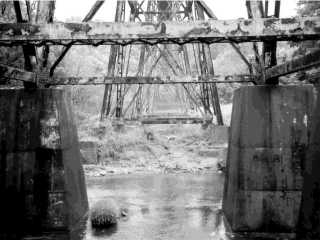
Pope Lick Trestle in Louisville, Kentucky, the reputed home of the Pope Lick Monster

Legend-tripping is a mostly harmless, perhaps even beneficial, youth recreation. It allows young people to demonstrate their courage in a place where the actual physical risk is likely slight. However, in what Ellis calls "ostensive abuse," the rituals enacted at the legend-tripping sites sometimes involve trespassing, vandalism, and other misdemeanors, and sometimes acts of animal sacrifice or other blood ritual. These transgressions then sometimes lead to local moral panics that involve adults in the community, and sometimes even the mass media. These panics often further embellish the prestige of the legend trip to the adolescent mind. In at least one notorious case, years of destructive legend-tripping, amounting to an "ostensive frenzy," led to the fatal shooting of a legend-tripper near Lincoln, Nebraska followed by the wounding of the woman whose house had become the focus of the ostension. The panic over youth Satanism in the 1980s was fueled in part by graffiti and other ritual activities engaged in by legend-tripping youths.

== Associated places in the United States ==
- The Baird Chair monument in Kirksville, Missouri
- Bachelor's Grove Cemetery, outside of Chicago, Cook County, Illinois
- The Black Agnes statue, formerly in Pikesville, Maryland and now in Washington, DC
- Bunny Man Bridge near Clifton, Virginia
- Crawford Road in Yorktown, Virginia
- Goat Man's Grave near Rolla, Missouri.
- Hexenkopf Rock in Williams Township, Pennsylvania

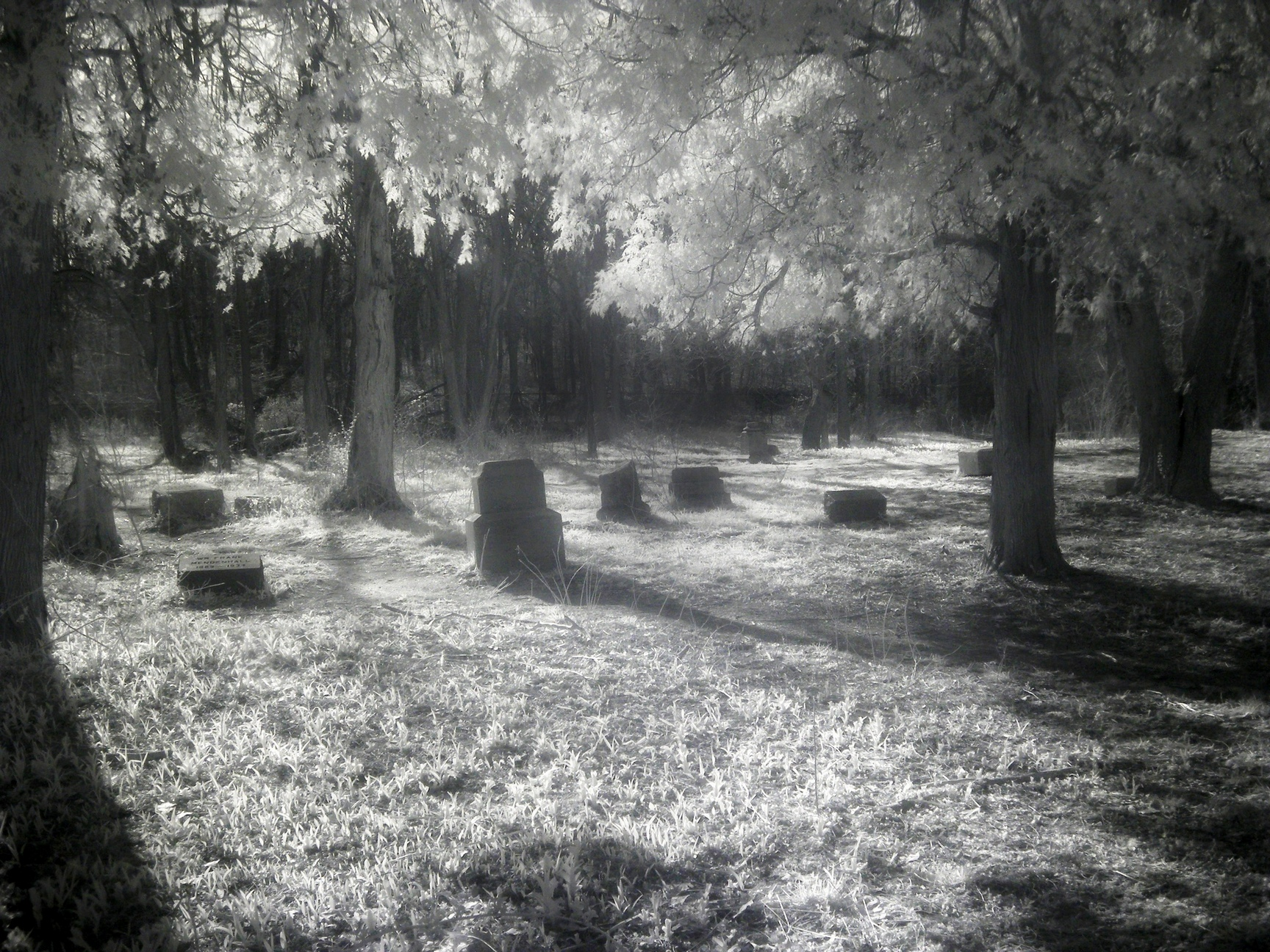
Bachelor's Grove cemetery (in infrared)

- The Hornet Spook Light twelve miles southwest of Joplin, Missouri
- The Lake View Public School, also known as the Gore Orphanage, near Cleveland, Ohio
- McHarry, Captain Frances burial spot in Harrison County, Indiana
- The Myrtle Hill Cemetery in Medina County, Ohio
- Ong's Hat, New Jersey
- Our Lady of the Angels School in Chicago, Illinois and its Fire Memorial in nearby Queen of Heaven Cemetery.
- Stull Cemetery in Stull, Kansas, claimed to be a "gateway to Hell"
- Waverly Hills Sanatorium, an abandoned hospital for tuberculosis victims, in Louisville, Kentucky

== See also ==
- Bloody Mary (folklore)
- Ghost hunting
- Haunted house
- Kimodameshi
- Stand by Me (film)
- The Devil's Chair (urban legend)
- Lilly E. Gray
- Emo’s Grave
