= Museo Provinciale di Torcello =

Provincial Museum of Torcello
- Museo Provinciale di Torcello
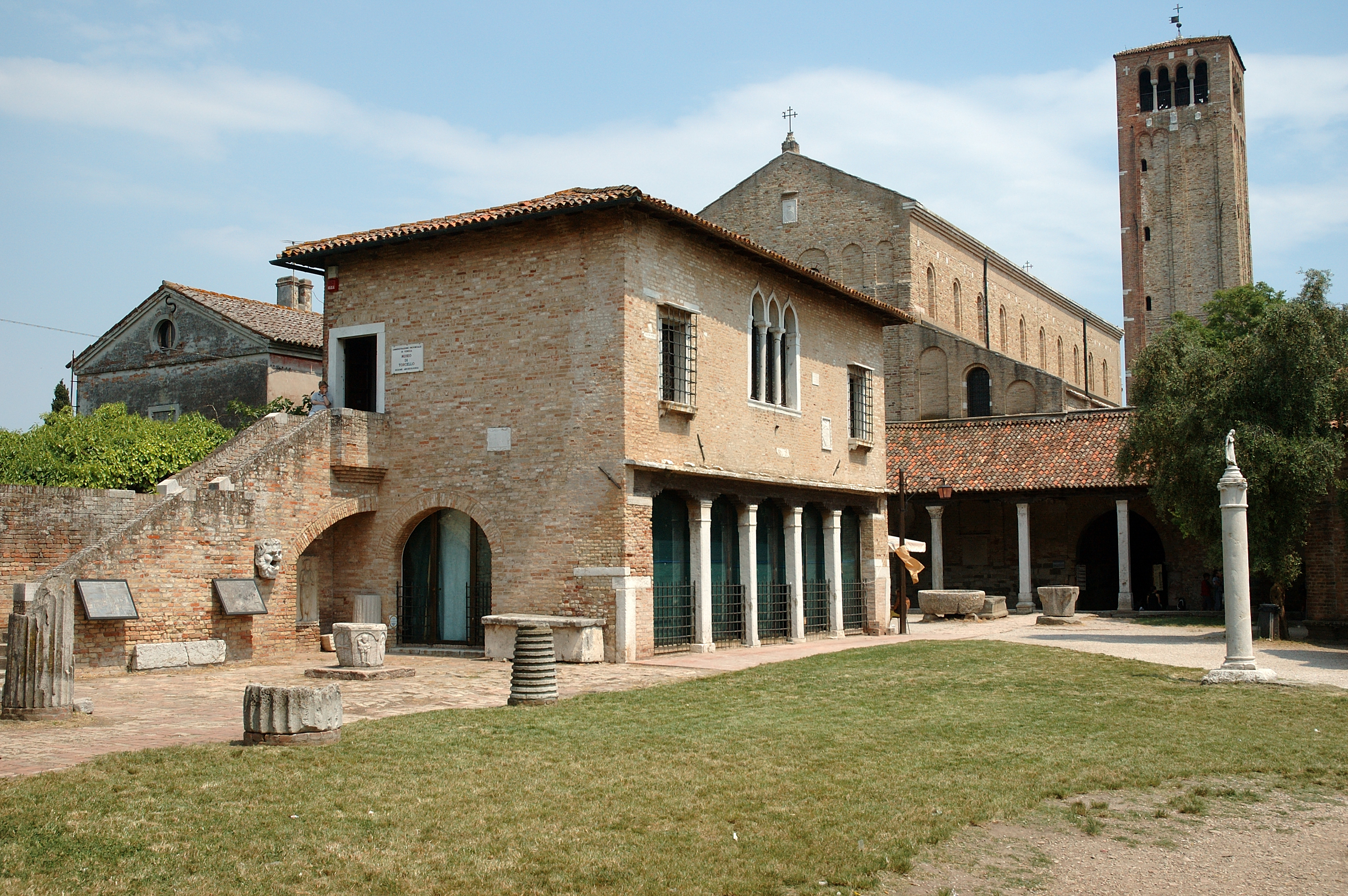
- Established: 14 May 1889
- Location: Torcello (Venice), Veneto, Italy
- Coordinates: 45.49845°N 12.41868°E
- Type: Archaeology museums, Art museum
- Collections: archaeology, medieval art, modern art
- Founders: Luigi Torelli, Cesare Augusto Levi
- Owner: Metropolitan City of Venice
- Public transit access: Torcello, Actv
- Website: www.museoditorcello.provincia.venezia.it

The Provincial Museum of Torcello (in Italian: Museo Provinciale di Torcello) is a museum founded at the end of 19th century on the Venetian island of Torcello. It has two sections: the Archaeological Section and the Medieval and Modern Section.

== History ==
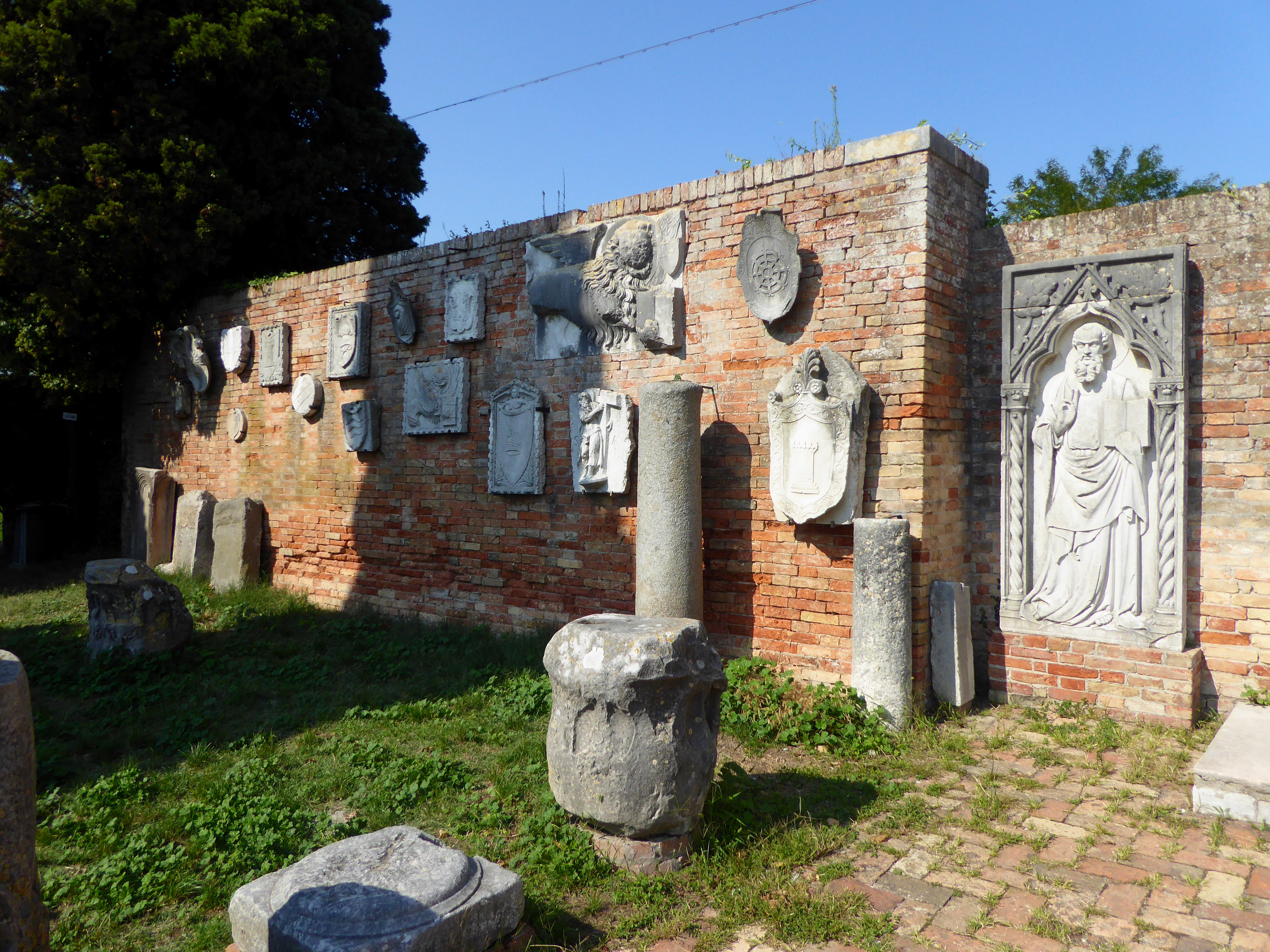
Archaeological artefacts outside the museum

In 1870, Luigi Torelli, the prefect of Venice, purchased the Palazzo del Consiglio to house a centre of archaeological artefacts found in Torcello, its adjacent islands and the nearby mainland. In 1872 after Torelli had given the building to the Province of Venice, the museum was founded, assigning the direction to the researcher Nicolò Battaglini. In 1887, Cesare Augusto Levi took his place: he continued the collection from the area and added others which he gathered during his travels, especially in Rome. In 1887, he bought the Palazzo dell’Archivio, restored it, and moved the archaeological collection there, naming it Museo dell’Estuario, donating it to the provincial authorities. On May 14, 1889, the Museo Provinciale di Torcello was inaugurated. In 1909, Levi was succeeded by Luigi Conton who discovered various necropolis in Adria from where he probably brought some findings to Torcello. Between 1928 and 1930, the collections were rearranged under the management of Adolfo Callegari, the director until 1948. In his period, inventory, cataloguing and restoration were undertaken, including the publication, in 1930, of the catalogue Il museo di Torcello.

In 1949, the direction was assigned to Giulia Fogolari who, with the assistance of Guido Zattera, supervised the museum until 1997. In 1974, after a radical restoration of the Palazzo del Consiglio and of the objects exhibited, the medieval and modern sections were opened. In the following years the Palazzo dell’Archivio was restored and the present archaeological section was inaugurated in the summer of 1990 with a new layout. From 2005 to 2006, the Palazzo del Consiglio was restored and adapted to safety regulations.

== Collections ==
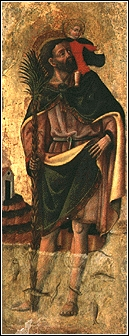
San Cristoforo

The museum houses a collection of works reflecting the history of the Venetian lagoon from private collections, archaeological finds, and artefacts purchased by collectors, as well as handicrafts discovered in Torcello, the adjacent islands and the neighbouring mainland. The museum is divided into two main sections: the archaeological finds and the medieval and modern sections. The Archaeological Section, which is housed in the Palazzo dell’Archivio, contains archaeological finds coming from the Lagoon and relics from other areas dating from the Palaeolithic era to the late-Roman period. The Medieval and Modern Section, which is housed in the Palazzo del Consiglio, contains objects and documents from the first centuries of the Christian Era until the 19th century presenting the history of the island of Torcello and its relations with the area of Altino, the Byzantine culture, and the city of Venice.

== Bibliography ==
- Callegari, Adolfo (1930). Il Museo Provinciale di Torcello (in Italian). Venice.
- Levi, Cesare Augusto (1988). Catalogo degli oggetti d'antichità del Museo Provinciale di Torcello con brevi notizie dei luoghi e delle epoche di ritrovamento (in Italian). Venezia.

== Sources ==
- Assessorato alla Cultura e al Patrimonio Culturale Museale
- Museo Provinciale di Torcello, a guide to the museum
- Regolamento Museo Provinciale di Torcello
- Museo del Torcello, sezione medievale e moderna
- Il Museo di Torcello, bronzi ceramiche marmi di età antica
