= Ostension: Word Learning and the Embodied Mind =

2014 book by Chad Engelland

- Authors: Chad Engelland
- Language: English
- Subject: Ostension
- Publisher: MIT Press
- Publication date: 2014
- Media type: Print (Hardcover)
- Pages: 336 pp.
- ISBN: 9780262028097

Ostension: Word Learning and the Embodied Mind is a 2014 book by Chad Engelland in which the author provides a philosophical introduction to ostension and its significance in word learning.
