= Gore Orphanage =

Urban Legend from Ohio, United States

Gore Orphanage is the subject of a local legend in Northern Ohio, which refers to a supposedly haunted ruin near the city of Vermilion in Lorain County, Ohio. The ruin is a building that formerly housed the Swift Mansion and, later, the Light of Hope Orphanage, and is the subject of local urban legends, whereby the violent deaths of young adults and children are alleged to have occurred. According to the urban legends, supernatural activity has occurred in the building since its closure.

Though historians have concluded that Gore Orphanage itself never existed, the Vermilion Chamber of Commerce has confirmed the existence of said orphanage, and discusses both the legend and truth of the orphanage. The legend claims that in the 1800s Vermilion, OH, U.S.A, a fire was set which killed many children and one woman, whose ghosts now haunt the ruins. Historians also have determined that Gore Orphanage is the name of a road, not a building, and many unrelated people, places, and events simply have been combined into a ghost story.

== History of the Gore Orphanage legend ==
=== Location aspect ===
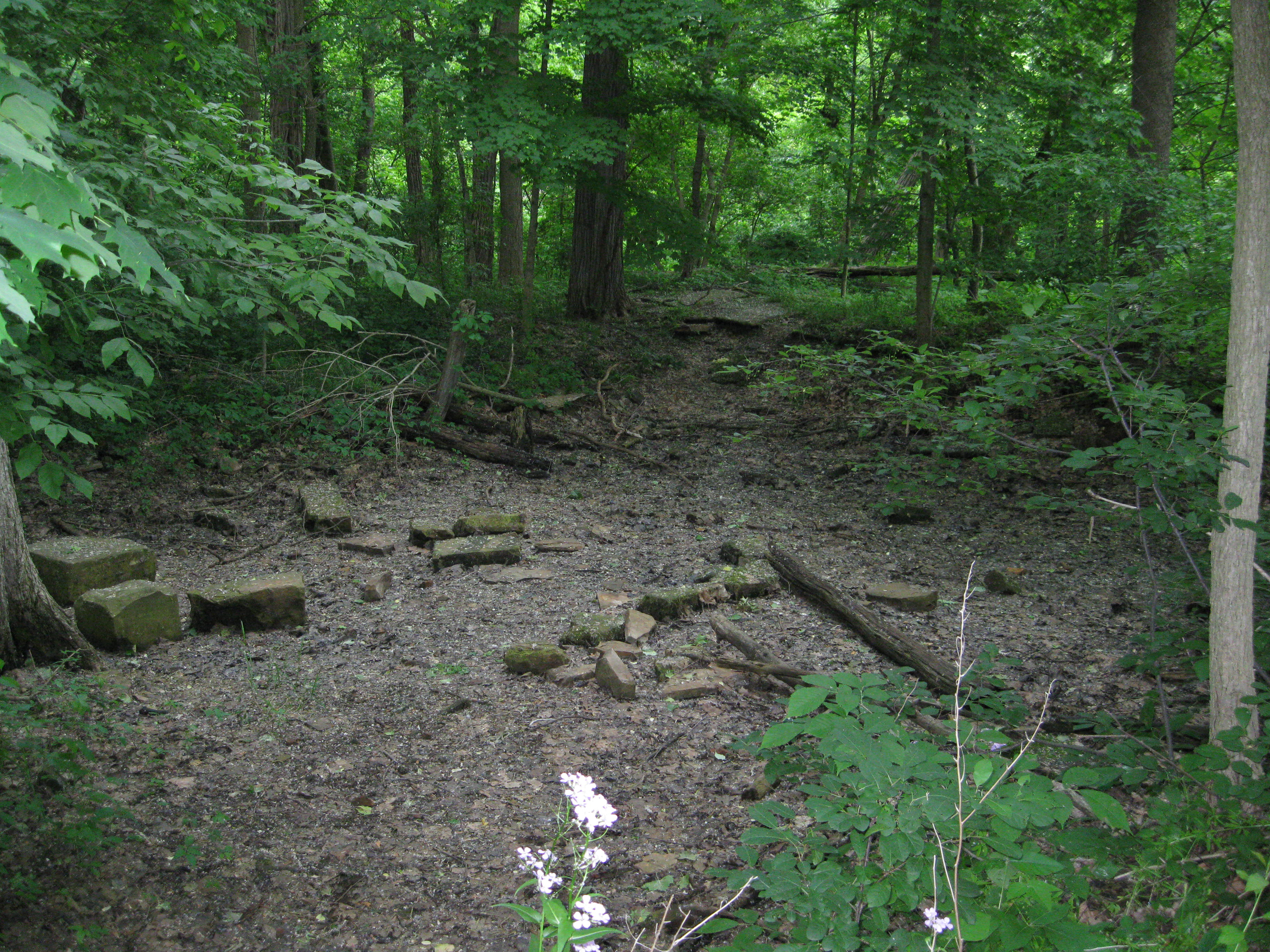
The actual location of Swift Mansion

The location that is claimed to be the actual site of Gore Orphanage is in fact the remains of Swift Mansion, also called Swift's Hollow, which was built and owned in 1840–42 by Joseph Swift. Gore Orphanage Road is the only location in Vermilion, Ohio, whose name contains the words "Gore Orphanage." Originally, the road was called simply "Gore Road," referring not to blood or tissue (as the ghost story implies) but to a surveyor's error in a gore (a narrow strip of land) along this road. The word "orphanage" in the road's name actually refers to the Light of Hope Orphanage, which is less than one mile away from the supposed Gore Orphanage site.

=== Fire aspect ===
The printing building of the Light of Hope Orphanage burned down during the morning of November 22, 1910, but without any injuries.

The Wilber family, who occupied Swift Mansion for a time, engaged in spiritual séances and eventually lost four young children to a local diphtheria epidemic; the séances and child deaths caused the location's reputation for being haunted. However, the Wilber children did not die in Swift Mansion.

The aspect of the legend regarding children trapped inside a burning building was likely inspired by the Collinwood school fire of 1908, which occurred years after the Swift Mansion events and the Light of Hope Orphanage opening and resulted in the deaths of 172 children and a few adults. Swift Mansion itself burned down on the night of December 6, 1923, though there were no human casualties.

=== Paranormal aspect ===
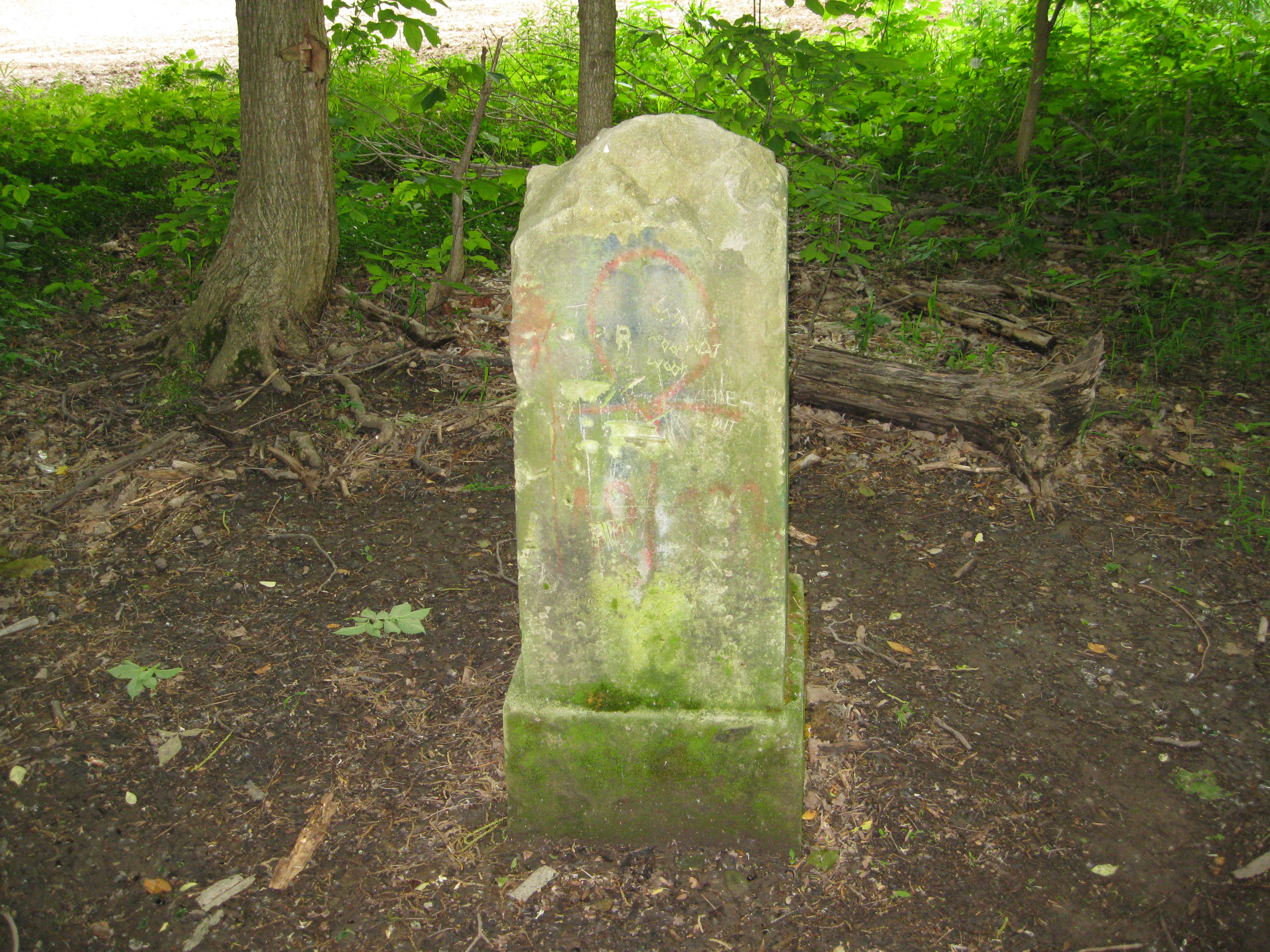
Driveway marker for Swift Mansion

The cries of orphans trapped in a fire, central to the legend, are claimed to be heard at the ruins of Gore Orphanage (Swift Mansion). However, investigators attribute the cries to the high-pitched hum of truck traffic on the nearby interstate highway, not visible from the area of the ruins. The Ohio Turnpike (Interstate 80) bridges the Vermilion River approximately 1 1/4 miles from the ruins. When a truck crosses the bridge, winds often carry the brief high hum to the ruins as a ghostly wail, unrecognizable as mechanical in origin.

A local activity known as "legend tripping" involves teenagers testing one another's courage with ghost stories of haunted locations to which they travel by automobile. As early as 1905, teenagers were visiting the Swift Mansion before it developed its current Gore Orphanage legend, in search of the supernatural, due to its reputation for being haunted. In later years, the sounds from unseen truck traffic were added to the legend as ghostly cries.

== Popular culture ==
A feature film by Principalities of Darkness LLC, is inspired by the legend. The film stars Maria Olsen and Bill Townsend.

Season 5 Episode 9 of the television show Supernatural takes place at a fictitious hotel built atop the ruins of Gore Orphanage in Vermilion, Ohio. The protagonists, Sam and Dean Winchester, do battle with the ghost of Gore Orphanage's caretaker and several children who she scalped and murdered.

== See also ==
- List of reportedly haunted locations in the United States
