= Chad Engelland =

American philosopher

Chad Anthony Engelland

Education
- Education: Catholic University of America (Ph.D.), Xavier University (B.A.)
- Thesis: Heidegger on Judgment in Leibniz and Kant: Overcoming Rationalism through Transcendental Philosophy (2006)
- Doctoral advisor: Richard Velkley

Philosophical work
- Era: 21st century Philosophy
- Region: Western philosophy
- School: Continental
- Institutions: University of Dallas
- Main interests: phenomenology, metaphysics, philosophical anthropology
- Notable ideas: philosophical analysis of ostension

Chad Anthony Engelland is an American philosopher and Professor of Philosophy at the University of Dallas. He is known for his research on the ideas of German philosopher Martin Heidegger. Engelland is a former editor-in-chief of Xavier Newswire (1998–1999).

== Books ==
- Divine Hiddenness: God the Creator and Phenomenology. Cambridge: Cambridge University Press, 2026
- Heidegger on Transcendence. Cambridge: Cambridge University Press, 2025
- Phenomenology. Cambridge, MA: The MIT Press, 2020
- Heidegger's Shadow: Kant, Husserl, and the Transcendental Turn. New York: Routledge, 2017
- The Way of Philosophy: An Introduction. Eugene, OR: Cascade Books, 2016
- Ostension: Word Learning and the Embodied Mind. Cambridge, MA: The MIT Press, 2014
