= Torcello =

Island of the Venetian Lagoon, Italy

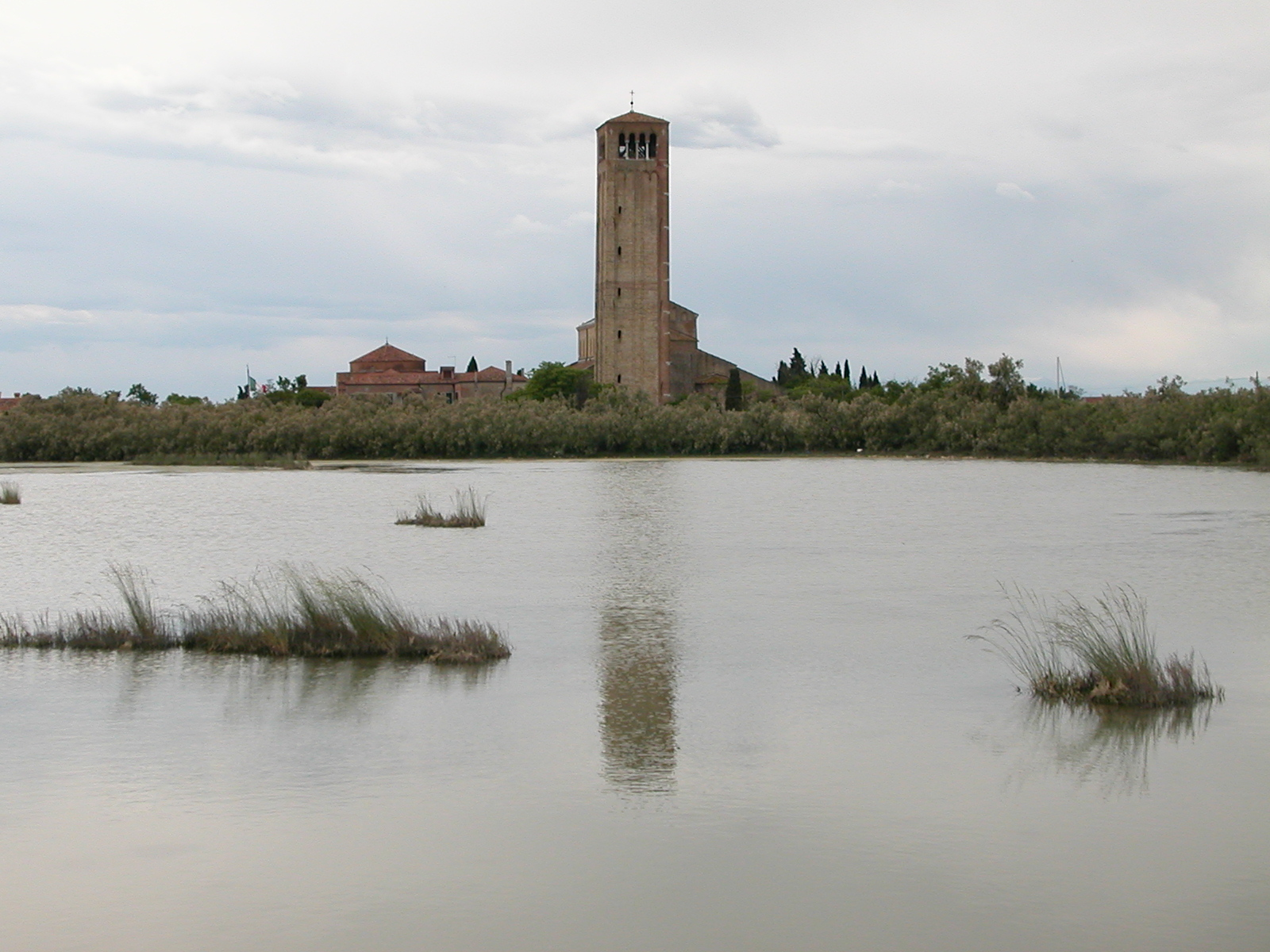
- View of Torcello

- Location within Venetian Lagoon

Geography
- Coordinates: 45°29′48″N 12°25′02″E
- Adjacent to: Venetian Lagoon

Administration
- Italy
- Region: Veneto
- Province: Province of Venice

Torcello (Latin: Torcellum; Venetian: Torceło, Torseo) is a sparsely populated island at the northern end of the Venetian Lagoon, in north-eastern Italy. It was first settled in 452 AD and has been referred to as the parent island from which Venice was populated. It was a town with a cathedral and bishops before St Mark's Basilica was built.

== History ==
After the downfall of the Western Roman Empire, Torcello was one of the first lagoon islands to be successively populated by those Veneti who fled the terra ferma (mainland) to take shelter from the recurring barbarian invasions, especially after Attila the Hun had destroyed the city of Altinum and all of the surrounding settlements in 452. Although the hard-fought Veneto region formally belonged to the Byzantine Exarchate of Ravenna since the end of the Gothic War, it remained unsafe on account of frequent Gothic (Sarmatian) invasions and wars: during the following 200 years the Lombards and the Franks fuelled a permanent influx of sophisticated urban refugees to the island’s relative safety, including the Bishop of Altino himself. In 638, Torcello became the bishop’s official seat for more than a thousand years and the people of Altinum brought with them the relics of Saint Heliodorus, now the patron saint of the island.

Torcello benefited from and maintained close cultural and trading ties with Constantinople: however, being a rather distant outpost of the Eastern Roman Empire, it could establish de facto autonomy from the eastern capital.

Torcello rapidly grew in importance as a political and trading centre: in the 10th century it had a population often estimated at 10,000–35,000 people, with 20,000 the most commonly cited estimate. However, some recent estimates by archeologists place it at closer to a maximum of 3,000. In pre-Medieval times, Torcello was a much more powerful trading center than Venice. Thanks to the lagoon’s salt marshes, the salines became Torcello’s economic backbone and its harbour developed quickly into an important re-export market in the profitable east-west-trade, which was largely controlled by Byzantium during that period.

The Black Death devastated the Venetian Republic in 1348 and again between 1575 and 1577. In three years, the plague killed some 50,000 people. In 1630, the Italian plague of 1629–31 killed a third of Venice's 150,000 citizens. A further serious issue for Torcello specifically was that the swamp area of the lagoon around the island increased by the 14th century, partly because of the lowering of the land level. Navigation in the laguna morta (dead lagoon) was impossible before long and traders ceased calling at the island. The growing swamps also seriously aggravated malaria.

As a result, by the late 14th century, a substantial number of people left for the islands of Murano, Burano, or Rialto (modern-day Venice). In 1689, the bishopric transferred to Murano, and by 1797, the population had dropped to about 300. It now has a full-time population of just 10 people, including the parish priest, according to some sources, and only 12 in 2018.

== Sights ==
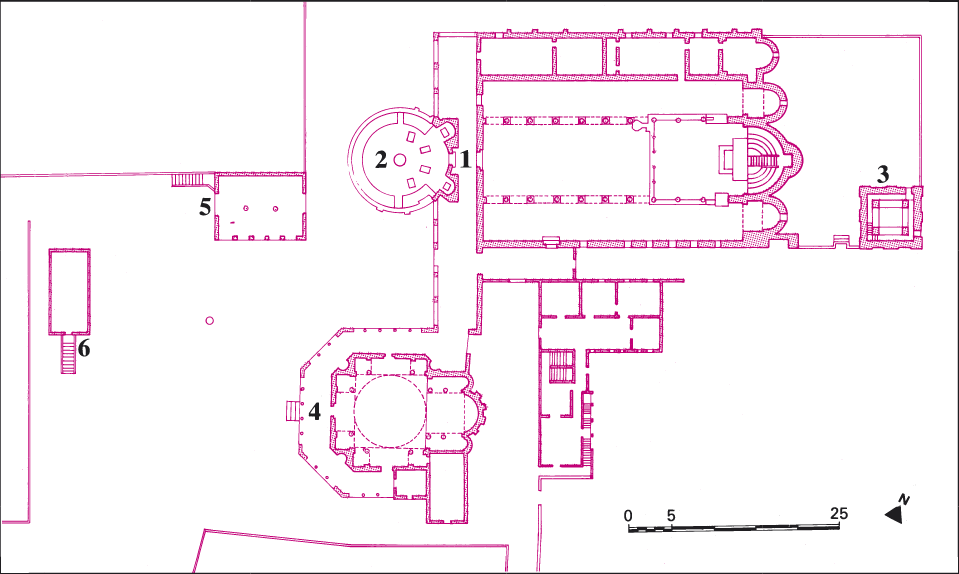
Venice. Island of Torcello: monumental complex. (1) Cathedral of S. Maria Assunta; (2) Remains of the Baptistery; (3) Bell Tower; (4) Church of S. Fosca; (5) Archive Palaces; (6) Council Palaces, now Torcello Museum.

Torcello's numerous palazzi, its twelve parishes and its sixteen cloisters have almost disappeared since the Venetians recycled the useful building material. One small palazzo is the only remaining medieval structure, consisting of a cathedral, a church, the town's former council chamber and archives (which house the museum), and the nearby basilica and campanile; the latter two were rebuilt in 1008.

Today's main attraction is the Cathedral of Santa Maria Assunta. Founded in 639, it is the oldest cathedral in the Venetian Lagoon. It is of basilica-form with side aisles but no crossing, and has much 11th and 12th century Byzantine work, including mosaics (e.g. a vivid version of the Last Judgement). Other attractions include the 11th and 12th century church of Santa Fosca, in the form of a Greek cross, which is surrounded by a semi-octagonal porticus, and the Museo Provinciale di Torcello housed in two fourteenth century palaces, the Palazzo dell'Archivio and the Palazzo del Consiglio, which was once the seat of the communal government.

Another noteworthy sight for tourists is an ancient stone chair, known as Attila's Throne. It has, however, nothing to do with the king of the Huns, but may have been the podestà's or the bishop's chair, or the seat where chief magistrates were inaugurated. Torcello is also home to a Devil's Bridge, known as the Ponte del Diavolo or alternatively the Ponticello del Diavolo (devil's little bridge).

== Famous residents ==
Ernest Hemingway spent some time there in 1948, writing parts of Across the River and Into the Trees. The novel contains representations of Torcello and its environs. In addition, numerous famous artists, musicians, and movie stars have spent time on the island, a quiet refuge. Torcello is the background for Daphne du Maurier's short story Don't Look Now.

== Gallery ==
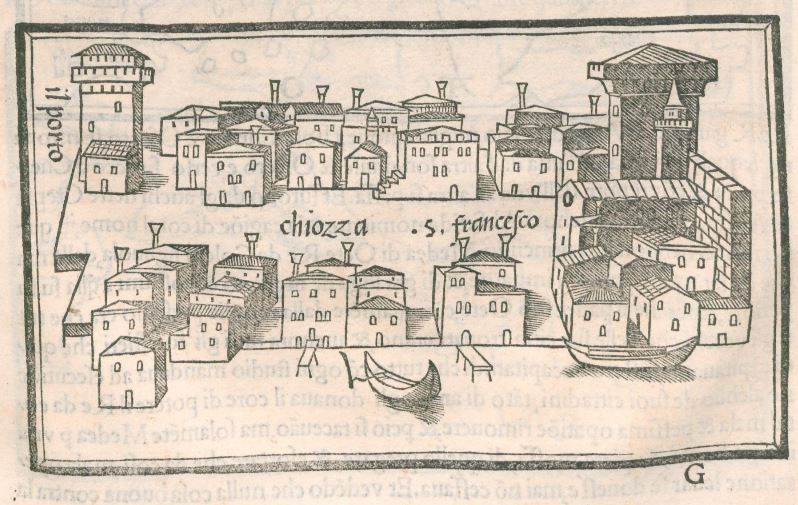
View of Torcello in a book published in Venice in 1534

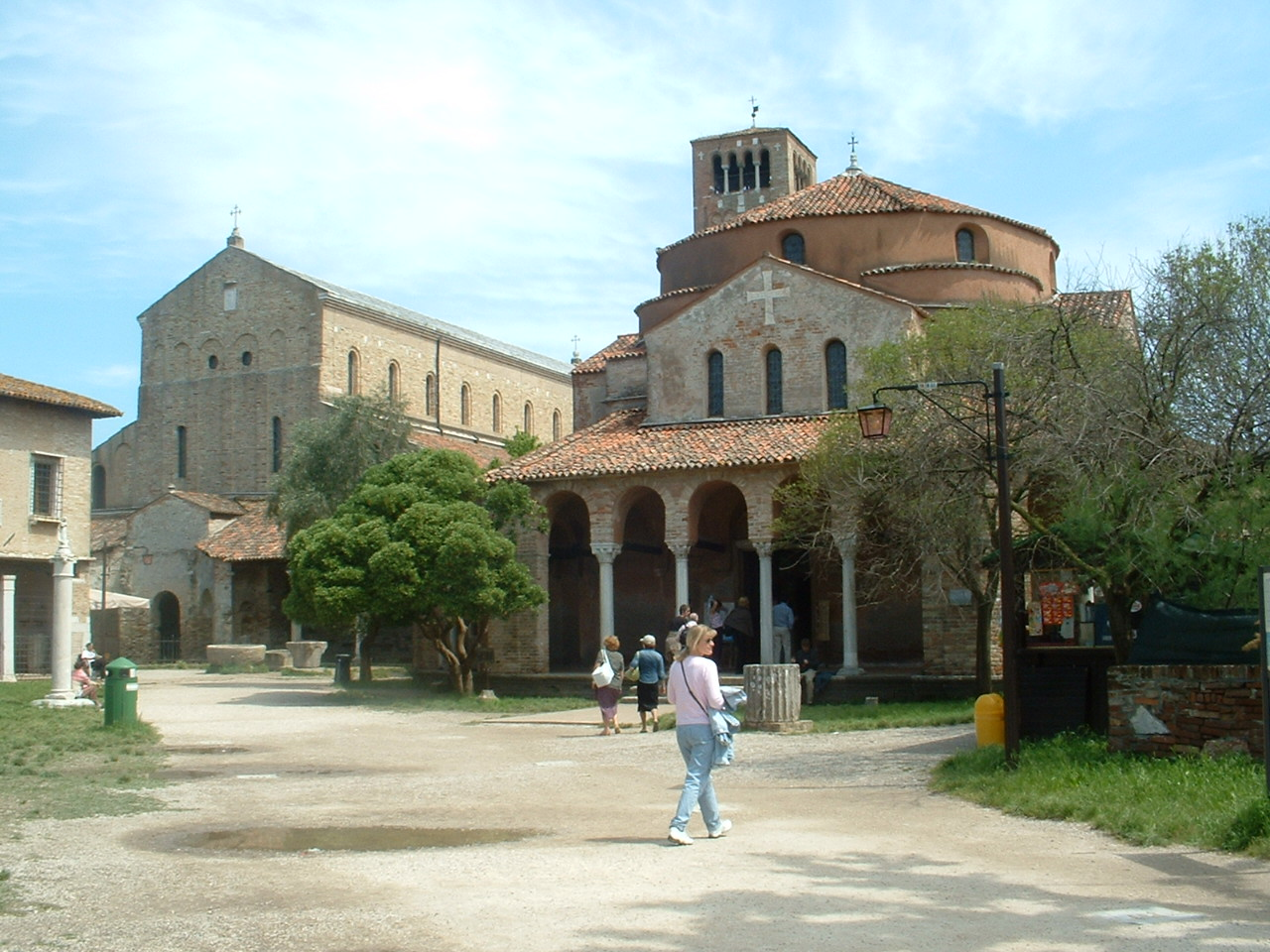
Central Torcello, with the Cathedral of Santa Maria Assunta and the Church of Santa Fosca

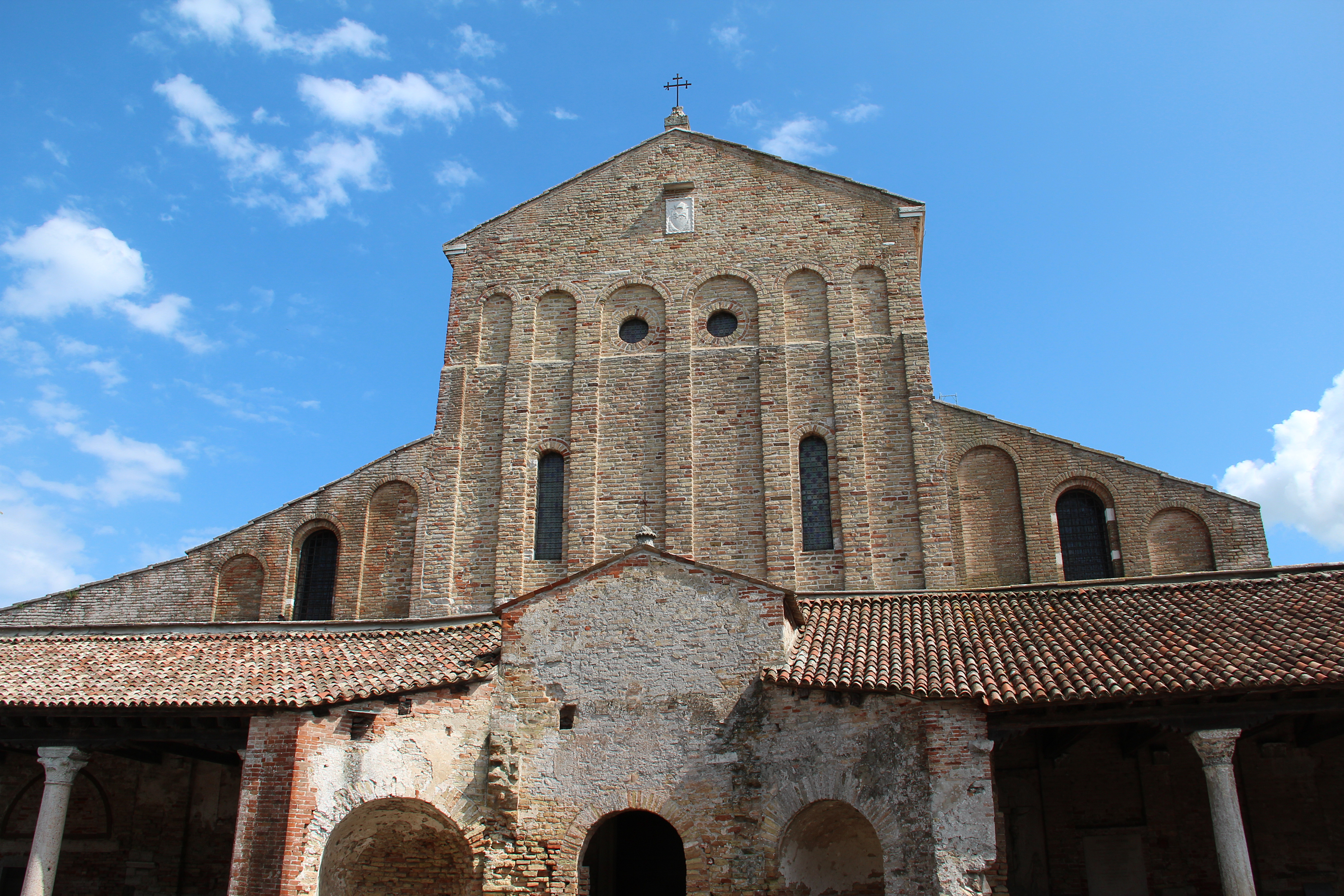
Facade of the cathedral.

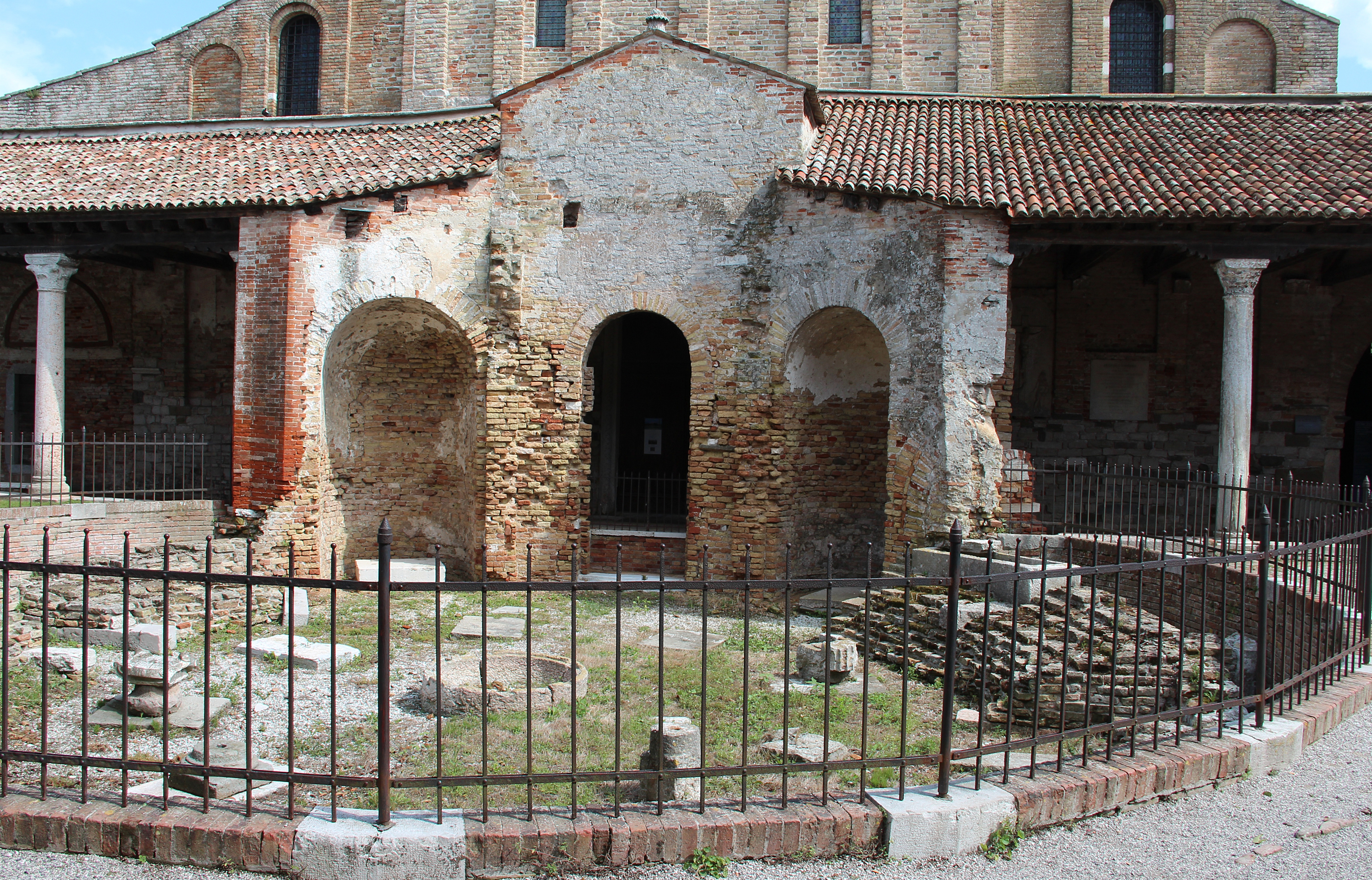
Narthex of the cathedral.

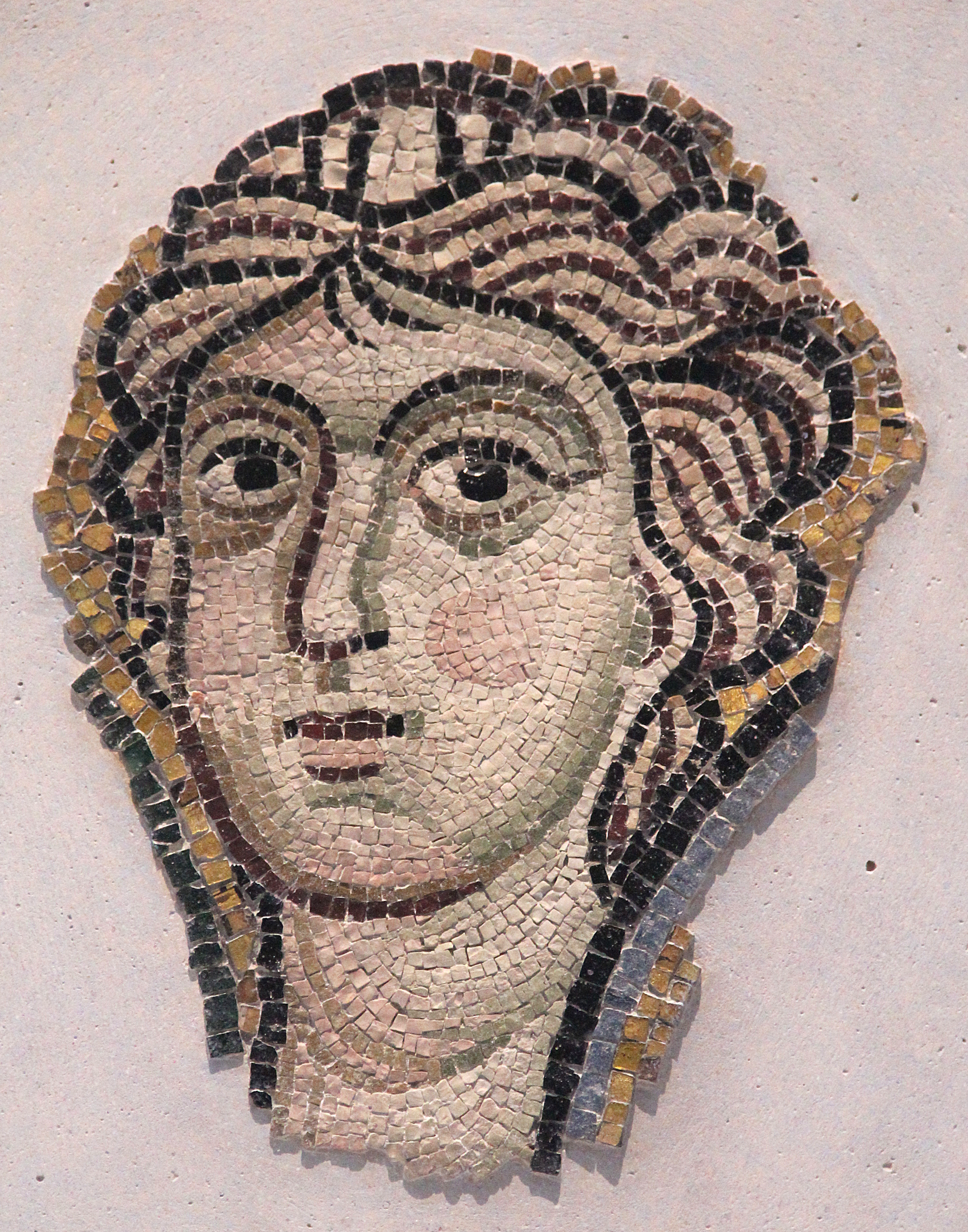
Mosaic from the cathedral in the Louvre in Paris.

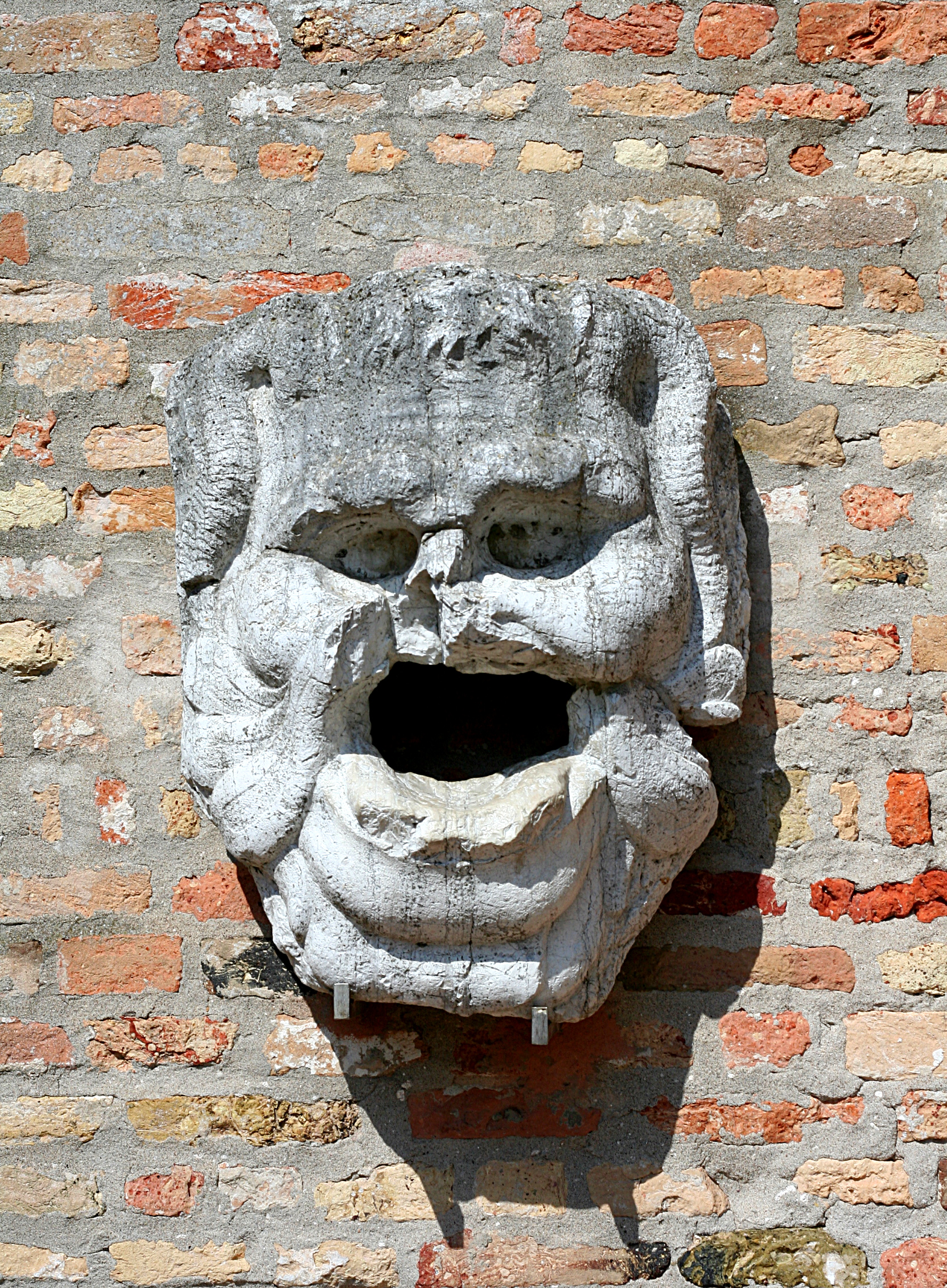
Sculpture of the Museo provinciale di Torcello.

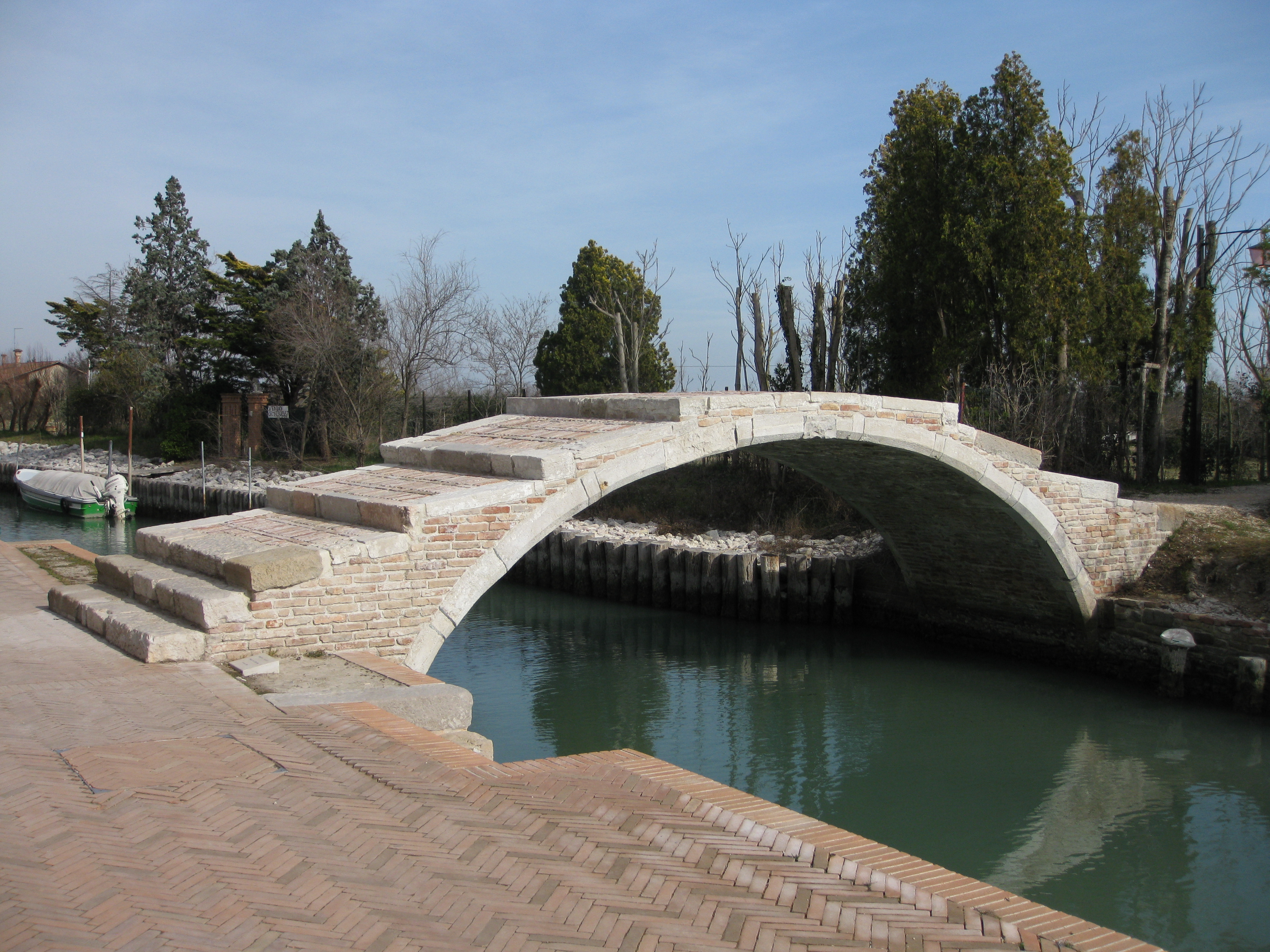
Ponte del Diavolo

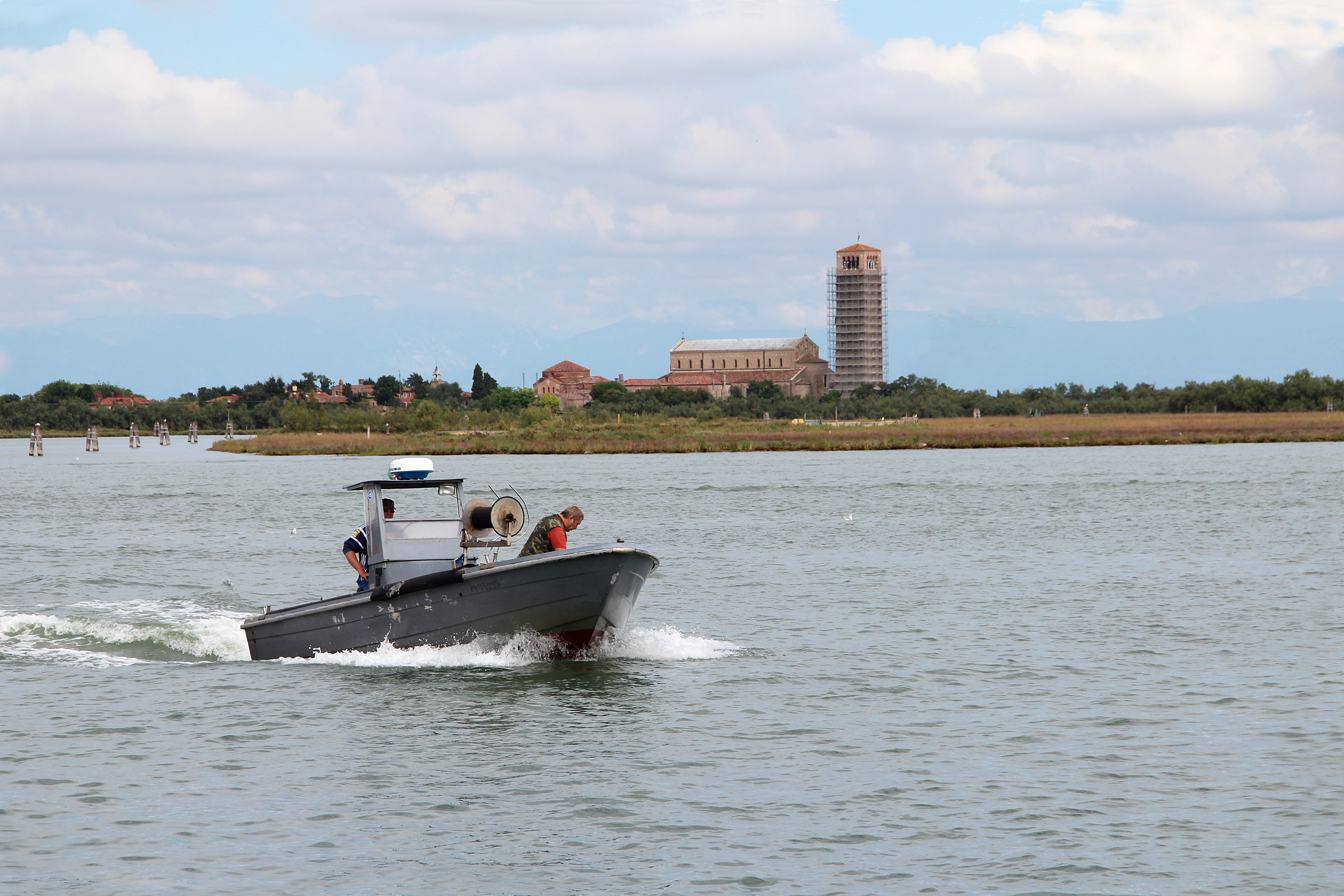
Torcello as seen from the Venetian lagoon

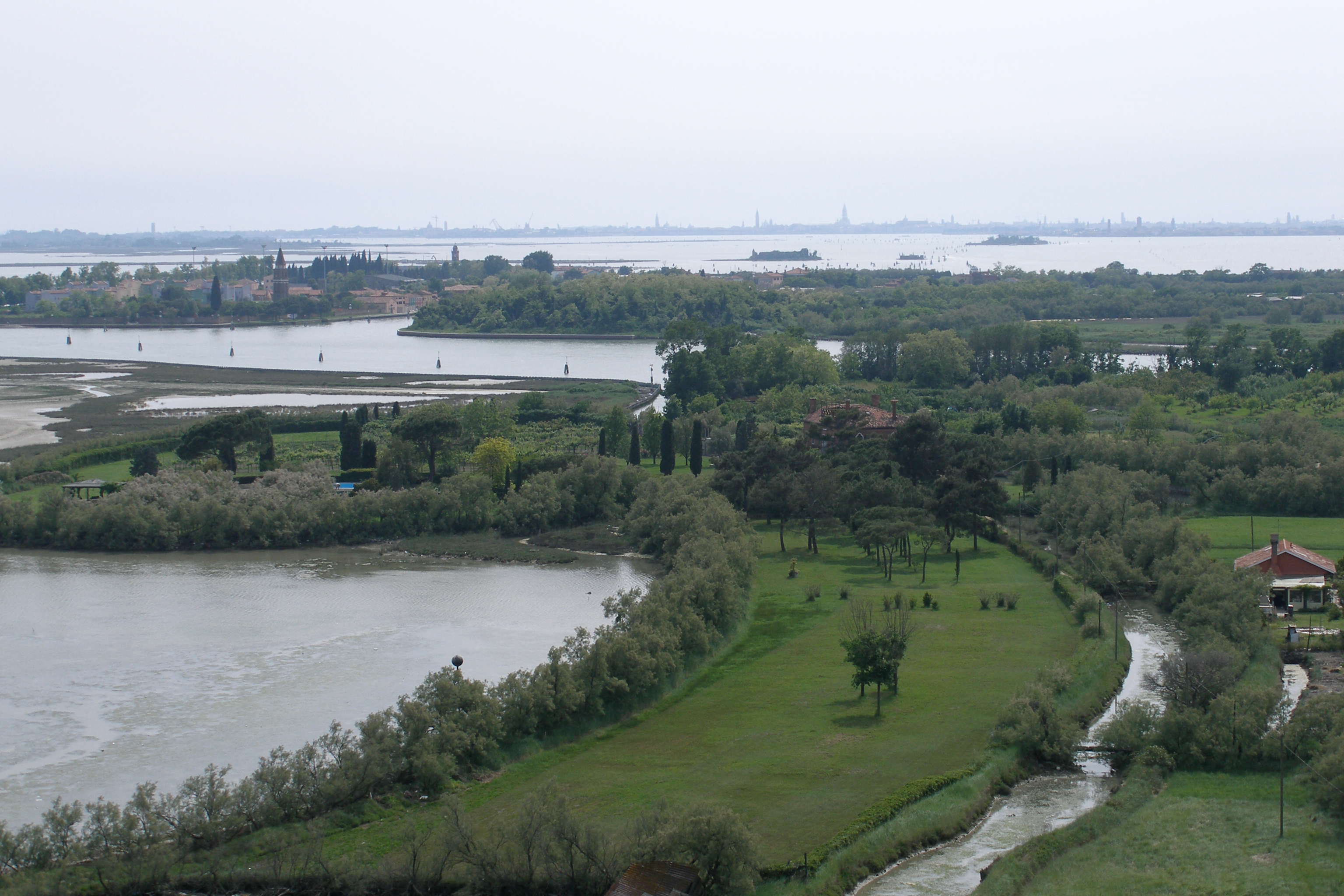
Venetian lagoon as seen from Torcello

== See also ==
- List of islands of Italy
