= Comprehension (logic) =

Totality of intensions of an object

In logic, the comprehension of an object is the totality of intensions, that is, attributes, characters, marks, properties, or qualities, that the object possesses, or else the totality of intensions that are pertinent to the context of a given discussion. This is the correct technical term for the whole collection of intensions of an object, but it is common in less technical usage to see 'intension' used for both the composite and the primitive ideas.

== See also ==
- Extension
- Extensional definition
- Intension
- Intensional definition
