= Enumerative definition =

Definition by exhaustively listing all of the objects a term applies to

An enumerative definition of a concept or term is a special type of extensional definition that gives an explicit and exhaustive listing of all the objects that fall under the concept or term in question. Enumerative definitions are only possible for finite sets and only practical for relatively small sets.

== Example ==
An example of an enumerative definition for the set

extant monotreme species

(for which the intensional definition is "species of currently-living mammals that lay eggs") would be:

platypuses
echidnae:

short-beaked echidna
long-beaked echidnae:

Sir David's long-beaked echidna
eastern long-beaked echidna
western long-beaked echidna

== See also ==
- Definition
- Extension
- Set notation
- Enumeration
