= Context as Other Minds =

Context as Other Minds (—subtitled The Pragmatics of Sociality, Cognition and Communication—) is a book, by Talmy Givón, published by John Benjamins in 2005.

== Contents of Book ==
The book presents a model of human linguistic communication, based on the idea that language is an evolutionary adaptation, where speakers address themselves to the context of minds they believe to be similar to their own.

== See also ==
- Cognitive science
- Context
- Pragmatics
- Psycholinguistics
- Sociolinguistics

== Bibliography ==
- Givón, Talmy. Context as Other Minds: The Pragmatics of Sociality, Cognition and Communication. Amsterdam: John Benjamins, 2005.
