= Intension =

Property or quality connoted by a word, phrase, or another symbol

In any of several fields of study that treat the use of signs—for example, in linguistics, logic, mathematics, semantics, semiotics, and philosophy of language—an intension is any property or quality connoted by a word, phrase, or another symbol. In the case of a word, the word's definition often implies an intension. For instance, the intensions of the word plant include properties such as "being composed of cellulose (not always true)", "alive", and "organism", among others. A comprehension is the collection of all such intensions.

== Overview ==
The meaning of a word can be thought of as the bond between the idea the word means and the physical form of the word. Swiss linguist Ferdinand de Saussure (1857–1913) contrasts three concepts:

1. the signifier – the "sound image" or the string of letters on a page that one recognizes as the form of a sign
2. the signified – the meaning, the concept or idea that a sign expresses or evokes
3. the referent – the actual thing or set of things a sign refers to. See Dyadic signs and Reference (semantics).

Without an intension of some sort, a word has no meaning. For instance, the terms rantans or brillig have no intension and hence no meaning. Such terms may be suggestive, but a term can be suggestive without being meaningful. For instance, ran tan is an archaic onomatopoeia for chaotic noise or din and may suggest to English speakers a din or meaningless noise, and brillig though made up by Lewis Carroll may be suggestive of 'brilliant' or 'frigid'. Such terms, it may be argued, are always intensional since they connote the property 'meaningless term', but this is only an apparent paradox and does not constitute a counterexample to the claim that without an intension a word has no meaning. Part of its intension is that it has no extension. Intension is analogous to the signified in the Saussurean system, extension to the referent.

In philosophical arguments about dualism versus monism, it is noted that thoughts have intensionality and physical objects do not (S. E. Palmer, 1999), but rather have extension in space and time.

== Statement forms ==
A statement-form is simply a form obtained by putting blanks into a sentence where one or more expressions with extensions occur—for instance, "The quick brown ___ jumped over the lazy ___'s back." An instance of the form is a statement obtained by filling the blanks in.

=== Intensional statement form ===
An intensional statement-form is a statement-form with at least one instance such that substituting co-extensive expressions into it does not always preserve logical value. An intensional statement is a statement that is an instance of an intensional statement-form. Here co-extensive expressions are expressions with the same extension.

That is, a statement-form is intensional if it has, as one of its instances, a statement for which there are two co-extensive expressions (in the relevant language) such that one of them occurs in the statement, and if the other one is put in its place (uniformly, so that it replaces the former expression wherever it occurs in the statement), the result is a (different) statement with a different logical value. An intensional statement, then, is an instance of such a form; it has the same form as a statement in which substitution of co-extensive terms fails to preserve logical value.

==== Examples ====
1. Everyone who has read Huckleberry Finn knows that Mark Twain wrote it.
2. Aristotle often remarked that he enjoyed stargazing.

The first example has a different logical value if the term "Mark Twain" is replaced with the co-extensive term "The author of Corn-pone Opinions", since not everyone who has read Huckleberry Finn knows that the same author also wrote Corn-pone Opinions.

The second example has a different logical value if the term "stargazing" is replaced with the co-extensive term "looking at luminous spheroids of plasma held together by self-gravity", since Aristotle would not have been aware of this definition of the term "star", and therefore would not have used it in a remark.

The intensional statements above feature expressions like "knows", "possible", and "pleased". Such expressions always, or nearly always, produce intensional statements when added (in some intelligible manner) to an extensional statement, and thus they (or more complex expressions like "It is possible that") are sometimes called intensional operators. A large class of intensional statements, but by no means all, can be spotted from the fact that they contain intensional operators.

=== Extensional statement form ===
An extensional statement is a non-intensional statement. Substitution of co-extensive expressions into it always preserves logical value. A language is intensional if it contains intensional statements, and extensional otherwise. All natural languages are intensional. The only extensional languages are artificially constructed languages used in mathematical logic or for other special purposes and small fragments of natural languages.

==== Examples ====
1. Mark Twain wrote Huckleberry Finn.
2. Aristotle enjoyed stargazing.

Note that if "Samuel Clemens" is put into (1) in place of "Mark Twain", the result is as true as the original statement. It should be clear that no matter what is put for "Mark Twain", so long as it is a singular term picking out the same man, the statement remains true. Likewise, we can put in place of the predicate any other predicate belonging to Mark Twain and only to Mark Twain, without changing the logical value.

For (2), the term "stargazing" can now be substituted with "looking at luminous spheroids of plasma held together by self-gravity", since Aristotle personally being aware of the two terms being co-extensive is no longer relevant to the logical value of the sentence.

== See also ==
- Description logic
- Connotation
- Extension (predicate logic)
- Extensionality
- Intensional definition
- Intensional logic
- Montague grammar
- Ostension
- Temperature paradox
- Sense and reference
- Set-builder notation
