= Exemplification =

In the philosophy of language, exemplification is a mode of symbolization characterized by the relation between a sample and what it refers to.

== Description ==
Unlike ostension, which is the act of showing or pointing to a sample, exemplification is possession of a property plus reference to its label (Goodman, 1976). For example, if a color sample has the property labelled 'green', then the color sample exemplifies green. At its most basic, possession of a property amounts to being correctly referred to by its label. In other words, an entity, 'x' can be said to possess a certain property if and only if: (1) there can be an abstract singular term which denotes that property, and (2) those assertions are true which predicate such an abstract term of a name or phrase denoting x.

== A mode of reference ==
Reference is the relation between something "standing for" something else, like the relation between a word and what it denotes. Usually reference goes in one direction, from the word to what it denotes, but it may also go in both directions, from the denoted back to the word. For instance, when a patch of green paint is used as a colour sample. The sample refers to green by possessing it and thus being referred to by the word denoting it. The sample exemplifies green, it stands for it, and in this way exemplification is a mode of reference.

== Uses of exemplification ==
- Product samples exemplify certain properties they possess.
- As a part in ostensive definition, i.e. definition by exemplification of what is defined. For example, an artist can define a new style by showing works that exemplify it.
- Defined exemplification is a pattern of essay development that uses specific instances (examples) to clarify a point, to add interest, or to persuade (Clouse, 2006).
- Exemplification means using examples to explain, convince, or amuse. Lending interest and information to writing, exemplification is one of the most common and effective ways to developing ideas. Examples may be developed in a sentence or more, or they may be only phrases or even single words, as in the following sentence: "Children like packaged breakfast foods, such as Wheaties, Cheerios, and Rice Krispies."

== See also ==
- Abstract object theory
- Nominalism
