= Intensional logic =

Approach to predicate logic

Intensional logic is an approach to predicate logic that extends first-order logic, which has quantifiers that range over the individuals of a universe (extensions), by additional quantifiers that range over terms that may have such individuals as their value (intensions). The distinction between intensional and extensional entities is parallel to the distinction between sense and reference.

== Overview ==
Logic is the study of proof and deduction as manifested in language (abstracting from any underlying psychological or biological processes). Logic is not a closed, completed science, and presumably, it will never stop developing: the logical analysis can penetrate into varying depths of the language (sentences regarded as atomic, or splitting them to predicates applied to individual terms, or even revealing such fine logical structures like modal, temporal, dynamic, epistemic ones).

In order to achieve its special goal, logic was forced to develop its own formal tools, most notably its own grammar, detached from simply making direct use of the underlying natural language. Functors (also known as function words) belong to the most important categories in logical grammar (along with basic categories like sentence and individual name): a functor can be regarded as an "incomplete" expression with argument places to fill in. If we fill them in with appropriate subexpressions, then the resulting entirely completed expression can be regarded as a result, an output. Thus, a functor acts like a function sign, taking on input expressions, resulting in a new, output expression.

Semantics links expressions of language to the outside world. Also logical semantics has developed its own structure. Semantic values can be attributed to expressions in basic categories: the reference of an individual name (the "designated" object named by that) is called its extension; and as for sentences, their truth value is their extension.

As for functors, some of them are simpler than others: extension can be attributed to them in a simple way. In case of a so-called extensional functor we can in a sense abstract from the "material" part of its inputs and output, and regard the functor as a function turning directly the extension of its input(s) into the extension of its output. Of course, it is assumed that we can do so at all: the extension of input expression(s) determines the extension of the resulting expression. Functors for which this assumption does not hold are called intensional.

Natural languages abound with intensional functors; this can be illustrated by intensional statements. Extensional logic cannot reach inside such fine logical structures of the language, but stops at a coarser level. The attempts for such deep logical analysis have a long past: authors as early as Aristotle had already studied modal syllogisms. Gottlob Frege developed a kind of two-dimensional semantics: for resolving questions like those of intensional statements, Frege introduced a distinction between two semantic values: sentences (and individual terms) have both an extension and an intension. These semantic values can be interpreted, transferred also for functors (except for intensional functors, they have only intension).

As mentioned, motivations for settling problems that belong today to intensional logic have a long past. As for attempts of formalizations, the development of calculi often preceded the finding of their corresponding formal semantics. Intensional logic is not alone in that: also Gottlob Frege accompanied his (extensional) calculus with detailed explanations of the semantical motivations, but the formal foundation of its semantics appeared only in the 20th century. Thus sometimes similar patterns repeated themselves for the history of development of intensional logic like earlier for that of extensional logic.

There are some intensional logic systems that claim to fully analyze the common language:

- Transparent intensional logic
- Modal logic

== Modal logic ==
Modal logic is historically the earliest area in the study of intensional logic, originally motivated by formalizing "necessity" and "possibility" (recently, this original motivation belongs to alethic logic, just one of the many branches of modal logic).

Modal logic can be regarded also as the most simple appearance of such studies: it extends extensional logic just with a few sentential functors: these are intensional, and they are interpreted (in the metarules of semantics) as quantifying over possible worlds. For example, the Necessity operator (the 'box') when applied to a sentence A says 'The sentence "('box')A" is true in world i if and only if it is true in all worlds accessible from world i'. The corresponding Possibility operator (the 'diamond') when applied to A asserts that "('diamond')A" is true in world i if and only if A is true in some worlds (at least one) accessible to world i. The exact semantic content of these assertions therefore depends crucially on the nature of the accessibility relation. For example, is world i accessible from itself? The answer to this question characterizes the precise nature of the system, and many exist, answering moral and temporal questions (in a temporal system, the accessibility relation relates states or 'instants' and only the future is accessible from a given moment. The Necessity operator corresponds to 'for all future moments' in this logic. The operators are related to one another by similar dualities to those relating existential and universal quantifiers (for example by the analogous correspondents of De Morgan's laws). I.e., Something is necessary if and only if its negation is not possible, i.e. inconsistent. Syntactically, the operators are not quantifiers, they do not bind variables, but govern whole sentences. This gives rise to the problem of referential opacity, i.e. the problem of quantifying over or 'into' modal contexts. The operators appear in the grammar as sentential functors, they are called modal operators.

As mentioned, precursors of modal logic include Aristotle. Medieval scholarly discussions accompanied its development, for example about de re versus de dicto modalities: said in recent terms, in the de re modality the modal functor is applied to an open sentence, the variable is bound by a quantifier whose scope includes the whole intensional subterm.

Modern modal logic began with the Clarence Irving Lewis. His work was motivated by establishing the notion of strict implication. The possible worlds approach enabled more exact study of semantical questions. Exact formalization resulted in Kripke semantics (developed by Saul Kripke, Jaakko Hintikka, Stig Kanger).

== Type-theoretical intensional logic ==
Already in 1951, Alonzo Church had developed an intensional calculus. The semantical motivations were explained expressively, of course without those tools that we now use for establishing semantics for modal logic in a formal way, because they had not been invented then: Church did not provide formal semantic definitions.

Later, the possible worlds approach to semantics provided tools for a comprehensive study in intensional semantics. Richard Montague could preserve the most important advantages of Church's intensional calculus in his system. Unlike its forerunner, Montague grammar was built in a purely semantical way: a simpler treatment became possible, thank to the new formal tools invented since Church's work.

== See also ==
- Extensionality
- Frege–Church ontology
- Kripke semantics
- Temperature paradox
- Relevance
