= Ostension (communication) =

Type of communication

In communication theory and especially in relevance theory, ostensive behaviour or ostension is a behaviour that signals the intention to communicate something. This can be a gesture, such as pointing, or shifting position to draw an addressee's attention to something, or eye contact.

Verbal communication (the act of speaking or writing something) is also ostensive behaviour, as it draws the addressee's attention to the fact that the communicator intends to convey some information. This is called the communicative intention. By contrast, the informative intention is the intention to convey said information, i.e. the actual content of the message.

In 1970s, semiotician Umberto Eco was the first to use the term "ostension" to describe the way in which people communicate messages through miming actions, as by holding up a pack of cigarettes to say, "Would you like one?"

The 2014 book Ostension: Word Learning and the Embodied Mind by Chad Engelland provides a philosophical introduction to ostension and its significance in word learning.

== See also ==
- Exemplification
- Intension
- Ostensive definition

== Literature ==
- Eco, Umberto (1976). A Theory of Semiotics. Indiana University Press. ISBN 0-253-20217-5.
- Sperber, Dan; Wilson, Deirdre (1995). Relevance: Communication and Cognition. Wiley-Blackwell. ISBN 978-0631198789.
