= Extension (predicate logic) =

Set of tuples in mathematical logic that satisfy a predicate

The extension of a predicate – a truth-valued function – is the set of tuples of values that, used as arguments, satisfy the predicate. Such a set of tuples is a relation.

== Examples ==
For example, the statement "d2 follows the weekday d1" can be seen as a truth function associating to each tuple (d2, d1) the value true or false. The extension of this truth function is, by convention, the set of all such tuples associated with the value true, i.e.

{(Monday, Sunday),
 (Tuesday, Monday),
 (Wednesday, Tuesday),
 (Thursday, Wednesday),
 (Friday, Thursday),
 (Saturday, Friday),
 (Sunday, Saturday)}

By examining this extension, we can conclude that "Tuesday follows the weekday Saturday" (for example) is false.

Using set-builder notation, the extension of the n-ary predicate $\Phi$ can be written as

$$\{ (x_1,...,x_n) \mid \Phi(x_1,...,x_n) \}\,.$$

== Relationship with characteristic function ==
If the values 0 and 1 in the range of a characteristic function are identified with the values false and true, respectively – making the characteristic function a predicate – , then for all relations R and predicates $\Phi$ the following two statements are equivalent:

- $\Phi$ is the characteristic function of R
- R is the extension of $\Phi$

== See also ==
- Extensional logic
- Extensional set
- Extensionality
- Intension
