= Extension (semantics) =

Extension of a concept, idea, or sign

In any of several fields of study that treat the use of signs — for example, in linguistics, logic, mathematics, semantics, semiotics, and philosophy of language — the extension of a concept, idea, or sign consists of the things to which it applies, in contrast with its comprehension or intension, which consists very roughly of the ideas, properties, or corresponding signs that are implied or suggested by the concept in question.

In philosophical semantics or the philosophy of language, the 'extension' of a concept or expression is the set of things it extends to, or applies to, if it is the sort of concept or expression that a single object by itself can satisfy. Concepts and expressions of this sort are monadic or "one-place" concepts and expressions.

So the extension of the word "dog" is the set of all (past, present and future) dogs in the world: the set includes Fido, Rover, Lassie, Rex, and so on. The extension of the phrase "Wikipedia reader" includes each person who has ever read Wikipedia.

The extension of a whole statement, as opposed to a word or phrase, is defined (since Gottlob Frege's "On Sense and Reference") as its truth value. So the extension of "Lassie is famous" is the logical value 'true', since Lassie is famous.

Some concepts and expressions are such that they don't apply to objects individually, but rather serve to relate objects to objects. For example, the words "before" and "after" do not apply to objects individually—it makes no sense to say "Jim is before" or "Jim is after"—but to one thing in relation to another, as in "The wedding is before the reception" and "The reception is after the wedding". Such "relational" or "polyadic" ("many-place") concepts and expressions have, for their extension, the set of all sequences of objects that satisfy the concept or expression in question. So the extension of "before" is the set of all (ordered) pairs of objects such that the first one is before the second one.

== Mathematics ==
In mathematics, the 'extension' of a mathematical concept $C$ is the set that is specified by $C$. (That set might be empty, currently.) In terms of quantifiers, extension is $\forall$ (for all), as opposed to intention which is $\exists$ (there exists).

For example, the extension of a function is a set of ordered pairs that pair up the arguments and values of the function; in other words, the function's graph. The extension of an object in abstract algebra, such as a group, is the underlying set of the object. The extension of a set is the set itself. That a set can capture the notion of the extension of anything is the idea behind the axiom of extensionality in axiomatic set theory.

This kind of extension is used so constantly in contemporary mathematics based on set theory that it can be called an implicit assumption. A typical effort in mathematics evolves out of an observed mathematical object requiring description, the challenge being to find a characterization for which the object becomes the extension.

== Computer science ==
In computer science, some database textbooks use the term 'intension' to refer to the schema of a database, and 'extension' to refer to particular instances of a database.

== Metaphysical implications ==
There is an ongoing controversy in metaphysics about whether or not there are, in addition to actual, existing things, non-actual or nonexistent things. If there are—if, for instance, there are possible but non-actual dogs (dogs of some non-actual but possible species, perhaps) or nonexistent beings (like Sherlock Holmes, perhaps)—then these things might also figure in the extensions of various concepts and expressions. If not, only existing, actual things can be in the extension of a concept or expression. Note that "actual" may not mean the same as "existing". Perhaps there exist things that are merely possible, but not actual. (Maybe they exist in other universes, and these universes are other "possible worlds"—possible alternatives to the actual world.) Perhaps some actual things are nonexistent. (Sherlock Holmes seems to be an actual example of a fictional character; one might think there are many other characters Arthur Conan Doyle might have invented, though he actually invented Holmes.)

A similar problem arises for objects that no longer exist. The extension of the term "Socrates", for example, seems to be a (currently) non-existent object. Free logic is one attempt to avoid some of these problems.

== General semantics ==
Some fundamental formulations in the field of general semantics rely heavily on a valuation of extension over intension. See for example extension, and the extensional devices.

== See also ==
- Enumerative definition
- Extensional definition
- Extensional logic
- Generalization
- Sense and reference
- Semantic property
- Type–token distinction
