= Definist fallacy =

Definist fallacy may refer to:

- Persuasive definition, misrepresenting an idiosyncratic definition as a term's common meaning
- Definist fallacy (logic), a purported fallacy involving the definition of one property in terms of another
