= Construct (philosophy) =

Object whose existence depends upon a subject's mind

An object's center of mass certainly "exists" in some sense, but not in the same sense in which the object itself does.

In philosophy, a construct is an object which is ideal, that is, an object of the mind or of thought, meaning that its existence may be said to depend upon a subject's mind. This contrasts with any possibly mind-independent objects, the existence of which purportedly does not depend on the existence of a conscious observing subject. Thus, the distinction between these two terms may be compared to that between phenomenon and noumenon in other philosophical contexts and to many of the typical definitions of the terms realism and idealism also. In the correspondence theory of truth, ideas, such as constructs, are to be judged and checked according to how well they correspond with their referents, often conceived as part of a mind-independent reality.

== Overview ==
As mind-dependent objects, concepts that are typically viewed as constructs include the abstract objects designated by such symbols as 3 or 4, or words such as liberty or cold as they are seen as a result of induction or abstraction that can be later applied to observable objects or compared to other constructs. Therefore, scientific hypotheses and theories (e.g. evolutionary theory, gravitational theory), as well as classifications (for example, in biological taxonomy), are also conceptual entities often considered to be constructs in the aforementioned sense. In contrast, most everyday, concrete things that surround the observer can be classified as objective (in the sense of being "real," that is, believed to be existing externally to the observer).

How much of what the observer perceives is objective is controversial, so the exact definition of constructs varies greatly across different views and philosophies. The view that the senses capture most or all of the properties of external objects directly is usually associated with the term direct realism. Many forms of nominalism ascribe the process of conceptual construction to language itself, for instance, constructing the idea of "fishness" by drawing distinctions between the word "fish" and other words (such as "rock") or through some kind of resemblance between the referents that the class implied by the word encompasses. Conversely, Platonic idealism generally maintains that a "reality" independent of the subject exists, though this reality is seen as ideal, not physical or material, and so it cannot be known by the senses. As such, the idea of "liberty" or "coldness" is just as real as that of "rockness" or "fishness."

The creation of constructs is a part of operationalization, especially the creation of theoretical definitions. The usefulness of one conceptualization over another depends largely on construct validity. To address the non-observability of constructs, U.S. federal agencies such as the National Institutes of Health and the National Cancer Institute have created a construct database termed Grid-Enabled Measures (GEM) to improve construct use and reuse.

In the philosophy of science, particularly in reference to scientific theories, a hypothetical construct is an explanatory variable which is not directly observable. For example, the concepts of intelligence and motivation are used to explain phenomena in psychology, but neither is directly observable. A hypothetical construct differs from an intervening variable in that it has properties and implications which have not been demonstrated in empirical research. These serve as a guide to further research. An intervening variable, on the other hand, is a summary of observed empirical findings.

== History ==
Cronbach and Meehl (1955) define a hypothetical construct as a concept for which there is not a single observable referent, which cannot be directly observed, and for which there exist multiple referents, but none all-inclusive. For example, according to Cronbach and Meehl a fish is not a hypothetical construct because, despite variation in species and varieties of fish, there is an agreed upon definition for a fish with specific characteristics that distinguish a fish from a bird. Furthermore, a fish can be directly observed. On the other hand, a hypothetical construct has no single referent; rather, hypothetical constructs consist of groups of functionally related behaviors, attitudes, processes, and experiences. Instead of seeing intelligence, love, or fear we see indicators or manifestations of what we have agreed to call intelligence, love, or fear.

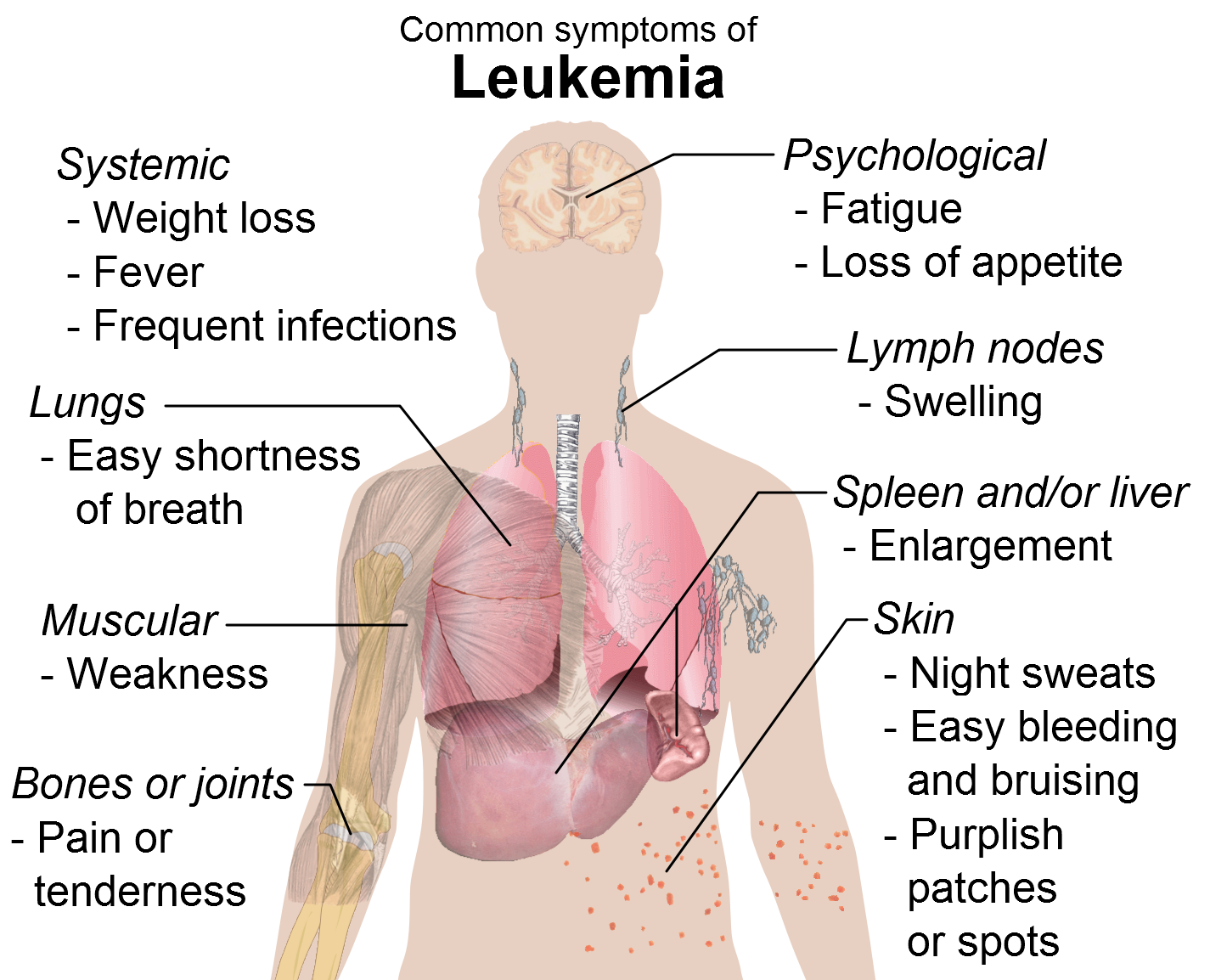
Diseases like Leukemia are important explanatory concepts, but do not 'exist' in the same way as a rock or a pencil

McCorquodale and Meehl (1948) discussed the distinction between what they called intervening variables and these hypothetical constructs. They describe hypothetical constructs as containing surplus meaning, as they imply more than just the operations by which they are measured.

In the positivist tradition, Boring (1923) described intelligence as whatever the intelligence test measures. As a reaction to such operational definitions, Cronbach and Meehl (1955) emphasized the necessity of viewing constructs like intelligence as hypothetical constructs. They asserted that there is no adequate criterion for the operational definition of constructs like abilities and personality. Thus, according to Cronbach and Meehl (1955), a useful construct of intelligence or personality should imply more than simply test scores. Instead, these constructs should predict a wide range of behaviors.
