= Stipulative definition =

Definition for the purpose of discussion

A stipulative definition is a type of definition in which a term is given a new specific meaning for the purposes of argument or discussion in a given context. When the term already exists, this definition may, but does not necessarily, contradict the dictionary (lexical) definition of the term. Because of this, a stipulative definition cannot be "correct" or "incorrect" within its stipulated context; it can only differ from other definitions, but it can be useful for its intended purpose.

For example, in the riddle of induction by Nelson Goodman, "grue" was stipulated to be "a property of an object that makes it appear green if observed before some future time t, and blue if observed afterward". "Grue" has no meaning in standard English; therefore, Goodman created the new term and gave it a stipulative definition.

== On stipulative definitions ==
Stipulative definitions of existing terms are useful in making theoretical arguments, or stating specific cases. For example:

- Suppose we say that to love someone is to be willing to die for that person.
- Take "human" to mean any member of the species Homo sapiens.
- For the purposes of argument, we will define a "student" to be "a person under 18 enrolled in a local school".

Some of these are also precising definitions, a subtype of stipulative definition that may not contradict but only extend the lexical definition of a term. Theoretical definitions, used extensively in science and philosophy, are similar in some ways to stipulative definitions (although theoretical definitions are somewhat normative, more like persuasive definitions).

Many holders of controversial and highly charged opinions use stipulative definitions referred to as persuasive definitions to attach the emotional or other connotations of a word to the meaning they would like to give it; for example, defining "murder" as "the killing of any living thing for any reason". The other side of such an argument is likely to use a different stipulative definition for the same term: "the unlawful killing of a human being with malice aforethought" or "the premeditated killing of a human being". The lexical definition in such a case is likely to fall somewhere in between.

When a stipulative definition is confused with a lexical definition within an argument there is a risk of equivocation.

== See also ==
- Persuasive definition
- Theoretical definition
