= Paradox =

Logically self-contradictory statement

A paradox is a logically self-contradictory statement or a statement that runs contrary to expectations. It is a statement that, despite apparently valid reasoning from true or apparently true premises, leads to a seemingly self-contradictory or a logically unacceptable conclusion. A paradox usually involves contradictory-yet-interrelated elements that exist simultaneously and persist over time. They result in "persistent contradiction between interdependent elements" leading to a lasting "unity of opposites".

In logic, many paradoxes exist that are invalid arguments, yet are nevertheless valuable in promoting critical thinking, while other paradoxes have revealed errors in definitions that were assumed to be rigorous, and have caused axioms of mathematics and logic to be re-examined. One example is Russell's paradox, which questions whether a "list of all lists that do not contain themselves" would include itself and showed that attempts to found set theory on the identification of sets with properties or predicates were flawed. Others, such as Curry's paradox, cannot be easily resolved by making foundational changes in a logical system.

Examples outside logic include the ship of Theseus, a paradox that questions whether a ship repaired over time by replacing each and all of its wooden parts one at a time would remain the same ship. Paradoxes can also take the form of images or other media. For example, M. C. Escher featured perspective-based paradoxes in many of his drawings, with walls that are regarded as floors from other points of view, and staircases that appear to climb endlessly.

The term paradox is often used to describe a counterintuitive result, which may be termed a veridical paradox.

== Common elements ==
Self-reference, contradiction and infinite regress are core elements of many paradoxes. Other common elements include circular definitions, confusion or equivocation between different levels of abstraction and vague or implicit assumptions.

=== Self-reference ===
Self-reference occurs when a sentence, idea or formula refers to itself. Although statements can be self referential without being paradoxical ("This statement is written in English" is a true and non-paradoxical self-referential statement), self-reference is a common element of paradoxes. One example occurs in the liar paradox, which is commonly formulated as the self-referential statement "This statement is false". Another example occurs in the barber paradox, which poses the question of whether a barber who shaves all and only those who do not shave themselves will shave himself. In this paradox, the barber is a self-referential concept.

=== Contradiction ===
Contradiction, along with self-reference, is a core feature of many paradoxes. The liar paradox, "This statement is false," exhibits contradiction because the statement cannot be false and true at the same time. The barber paradox is contradictory because it implies that the barber shaves himself if and only if the barber does not shave himself.

As with self-reference, a statement can contain a contradiction without being a paradox. "This statement is written in French" is an example of a contradictory self-referential statement that is not a paradox and is instead false.

=== Vicious circularity, or infinite regress ===
Vicious circularity illustrated

Another core aspect of paradoxes is non-terminating recursion, in the form of circular reasoning or infinite regress. When this recursion creates a metaphysical impossibility through contradiction, the regress or circularity is vicious. Again, the liar paradox is an instructive example: "This statement is false"—if the statement is true, then the statement is false, thereby making the statement true, thereby making the statement false, and so on.

The barber paradox also exemplifies vicious circularity: The barber shaves those who do not shave themselves, so if the barber does not shave himself, then he shaves himself, then he does not shave himself, and so on.

=== Other elements ===
Other paradoxes involve false statements and half-truths or rely on hasty assumptions (A father and his son are in a car crash; the father is killed and the boy is rushed to the hospital. The doctor says, "I can't operate on this boy. He's my son." There is no contradiction; the doctor is the boy's mother.).

Paradoxes that are not based on a hidden error generally occur at the fringes of context or language, and require extending the context or language in order to lose their paradoxical quality. Paradoxes that arise from apparently intelligible uses of language are often of interest to logicians and philosophers. "This sentence is false" is an example of the well-known liar paradox: it is a sentence that cannot be consistently interpreted as either true or false, because if it is known to be false, then it can be inferred that it must be true, and if it is known to be true, then it can be inferred that it must be false. Russell's paradox, which shows that the notion of the set of all those sets that do not contain themselves leads to a contradiction, was instrumental in the development of modern logic and set theory.

Thought experiments can also yield interesting paradoxes. The grandfather paradox, for example, would arise if a time traveler were to kill his own grandfather before his mother or father had been conceived, thereby preventing his own birth. This is a specific instance of the butterfly effect – in that any interaction a time traveler has with the past would alter conditions such that divergent events "propagate" through the world over time, ultimately altering the circumstances in which the time travel initially takes place.

Often a seemingly paradoxical conclusion arises from an inconsistent or inherently contradictory definition of the initial premise. In the case of that apparent paradox of a time traveler killing his own grandfather, it is the inconsistency of defining the past to which he returns as being somehow different from the one that leads up to the future from which he begins his trip, but also insisting that he must have come to that past from the same future as the one that it leads up to.

== Quine's classification ==
W. V. O. Quine (1962) distinguished between three classes of paradoxes:

=== Veridical paradox ===
A veridical paradox produces a result that appears counter to intuition, but is demonstrated to be true nonetheless:

- Condorcet's paradox demonstrates the surprising result that majority rule can be self-contradictory, i.e. it is possible for a majority of voters to support some outcome other than the one chosen (regardless of the outcome itself).
- The Monty Hall paradox (or equivalently three prisoners problem or Bertrand's box paradox) demonstrates that a decision that has an intuitive fifty–fifty chance can instead have a provably different probable outcome. Another veridical paradox with a concise mathematical proof is the birthday paradox.
- In 20th-century science, Hilbert's paradox of the Grand Hotel is an example of a theory being taken to a logical but paradoxical end.
- Arrow's impossibility theorem demonstrates that no ranked voting system can convert individual preferences into a collective ranking without violating basic fairness criteria.

=== Falsidical paradox ===
A falsidical paradox establishes a result that appears false and actually is false, due to a fallacy in the demonstration. Therefore, falsidical paradoxes can be classified as fallacious arguments.

=== Antinomy ===
An antinomy is a paradox which reaches a self-contradictory result by properly applying accepted ways of reasoning. For example, the Grelling–Nelson paradox points out genuine problems in our understanding of the ideas of truth and description.

Sometimes described since Quine's work, a dialetheia is a paradox that is both true and false at the same time. It may be regarded as a fourth kind, or alternatively as a special case of antinomy. In logic, it is often assumed, following Aristotle, that no dialetheia exist, but they are allowed in some paraconsistent logics.

== Ramsey's classification ==
Frank Ramsey drew a distinction between logical paradoxes and semantic paradoxes, with Russell's paradox belonging to the former category, and the liar paradox and Grelling's paradoxes to the latter. Ramsey introduced the by-now standard distinction between logical and semantical contradictions. Logical contradictions involve mathematical or logical terms like class and number, and hence show that our logic or mathematics is problematic. Semantical contradictions involve, besides purely logical terms, notions like thought, language, and symbolism, which, according to Ramsey, are empirical (not formal) terms. Hence these contradictions are due to faulty ideas about thought or language, and they properly belong to epistemology.

== In medicine ==
A paradoxical reaction to a drug is the opposite of what one would expect, such as becoming agitated by a sedative or sedated by a stimulant. Some are common and are used regularly in medicine, such as the use of stimulants such as Adderall and Ritalin in the treatment of attention deficit hyperactivity disorder (also known as ADHD), while others are rare and can be dangerous as they are not expected, such as severe agitation from a benzodiazepine.

The actions of antibodies on antigens can rarely take paradoxical turns in certain ways. One example is antibody-dependent enhancement (immune enhancement) of a disease's virulence; another is the hook effect (prozone effect), of which there are several types. However, neither of these problems is common, and overall, antibodies are crucial to health, as most of the time they do their protective job quite well.

In the smoker's paradox, cigarette smoking, despite its proven harms, has a surprising inverse correlation with the epidemiological incidence of certain diseases.

In the negative outcome penalty paradox, the use of artificial intelligence in medical decision-making increases the risk of being penalized by juries whether the AI recommendations are followed or rejected.

== As an aspect of reality ==
Carl Jung stated: "the paradox reflects a higher level of intellect and, by not forcibly representing the unknowable as known, gives a more faithful picture of the real state of affairs." Søren Kierkegaard posited that any true understanding of reality requires one to abandon rationalism and take a "leap of faith" into paradoxical thinking. Some have observed that the fundamental nature of reality is difficult to grasp or express in words because it is innately paradoxical and contradictory.

== Teaching tool ==
Paradoxes can be used in management education.

Paradoxical questions, known as koan, are used as a teaching device in Zen Buddhism.

== See also ==
- Absurdism – Theory that life is meaningless
- Animalia Paradoxa – Mythical, magical or otherwise suspect animals mentioned in Systema Naturae
- Aporia – State of puzzlement or expression of doubt, in philosophy and rhetoric
- Contronym
- Dilemma – Problem requiring a choice between equally undesirable alternatives
- Ethical dilemma – Type of dilemma in philosophy
- Fallacy – Argument that uses faulty reasoning
- Formal fallacy – Faulty deductive reasoning due to a logical flaw
- Impossible object – Type of optical illusion
- Category:Mathematical paradoxes
- List of paradoxes – List of statements that appear to contradict themselves
- Mu (negative) – Term meaning 'not', 'without', or 'lack'
- Oxymoron – Figure of speech
- Revision theory
- Self-refuting idea – Idea that refutes itself
- Syntactic ambiguity – Sentences with structures permitting multiple possible interpretations
