= Lexical definition =

Dictionary-style definition of a word

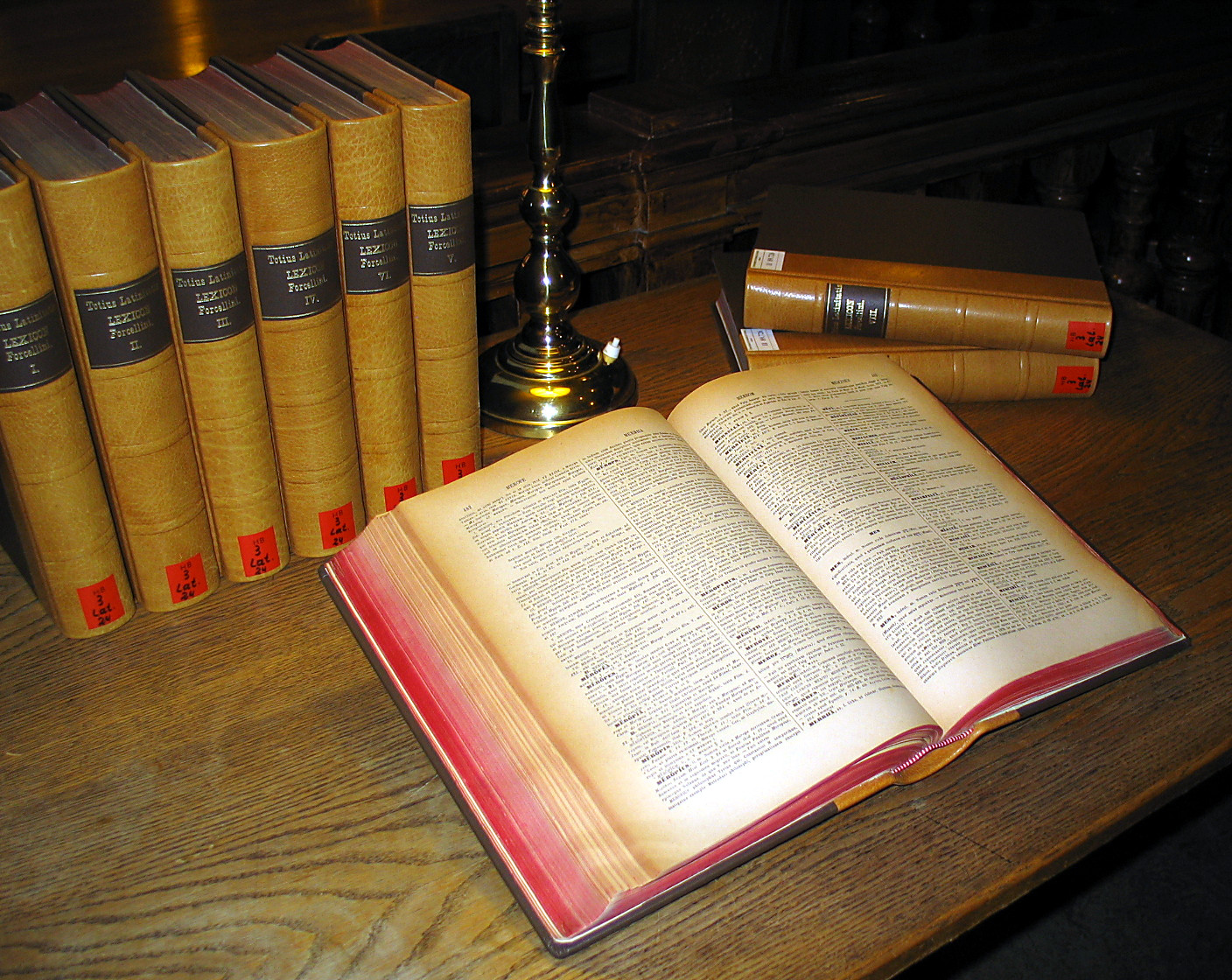
Lexical definitions are commonly found in dictionaries

The lexical definition of a term, also known as the dictionary definition, describes the meaning of a word in terms of other words, and it is the style of definition commonly found in dictionaries. A lexical definition is usually the type expected from a request for definition, and it is generally expected that such a definition will be stated as simply as possible in order to convey information to the widest audience.

== Usage ==
A lexical definition is a descriptive aid for people who already speak the language. The usefulness of a lexical definition depends on whether the words used in the definition are known by the reader. They are usually static and need to be updated as meanings change over time.

Philosophers have considered whether lexical definitions have truth values, and how differences between usage and lexical definition affect truth values of lexical definitions.

Note that a lexical definition is descriptive, reporting actual usage within speakers of a language, and changes with changing usage of the term, rather than prescriptive, which would be to stick with a version regarded as "correct", regardless of drift in accepted meaning. They tend to be inclusive, attempting to capture everything the term is used to refer to, and as such are often too vague for many purposes.

== Types ==
When the breadth or vagueness of a lexical definition is unacceptable, a precising definition or a stipulative definition is often used.

Words can be classified as lexical or nonlexical. Lexical words are those that have independent meaning (such as a Noun (N), verb (V), adjective (A), adverb (Adv), or preposition (P)).

The definition which reports the meaning of a word or a phrase as it is actually used by people is called a lexical definition. Meanings of words given in a dictionary are lexical definitions. As a word may have more than one meaning, it may also have more than one lexical definition.

== See also ==
- Circular definition
- Definition
- Theoretical definition
