= Persuasive definition =

Stipulative, biased definition of a term

A persuasive definition is a form of stipulative definition which purports to describe the true or commonly accepted meaning of a term, while in reality stipulating an uncommon or altered use, usually to support an argument for some view, or to create or alter rights, duties or crimes. The terms thus defined will often involve emotionally charged but imprecise notions, such as freedom, terrorism, antisemitism, democracy, etc. In argumentation the use of a persuasive definition is sometimes called definist fallacy. (Note: Not to be confused with the logic term.)

Examples of persuasive definitions (definist fallacies) include:

- Democrat – "a leftist who desires to overtax the corporations and abolish freedom in the economic sphere".
- Atheist – "someone who doesn't yet realize that God exists."

Persuasive definitions commonly appear in controversial topics such as politics, sex, and religion, as participants in emotionally charged exchanges will sometimes become more concerned about swaying people to one side or another than expressing the unbiased facts. A persuasive definition of a term is favorable to one argument or unfavorable to the other argument, but is presented as if it were neutral and well-accepted, and the listener is expected to accept such a definition without question.

The term "persuasive definition" was introduced by philosopher Charles Stevenson as part of his emotive theory of meaning.

== Overview ==
Language can simultaneously communicate information (informative) and feelings (expressive). Unlike other common types of definitions in logic, persuasive definitions focus on the expressive use of language to affect the feelings of readers and listeners ultimately with an aim to change their behavior. With this fundamentally different purpose, persuasive definitions are evaluated not on their truth or falsehood but rather on their effectiveness as a persuasive device. Stevenson showed how these two dimensions are combined when he investigated the terms he called "ethical" or emotive. He noted that some words, such as peace or war, are not simply used to describe reality by modifying the cognitive response of the interlocutor. They have also the power of directing the interlocutor's attitudes and suggesting a course of action. For this reason, they evoke a different kind of reaction, emotive in nature. As Stevenson put it: "Instead of merely describing people's interests, they change and intensify them. They recommend an interest in an object, rather than state that the interest already exists." These words have the tendency to encourage future actions, to lead the hearer towards a decision by affecting his or her system of interests. Stevenson distinguished between the use of a word (a stimulus) and its possible psychological effects on the addressee's cognitive and the emotive reactions by labeling them as "descriptive meaning" and "emotive meaning". Applying this distinction reveals how the redefinition of an ethical word is transformed into an instrument of persuasion, a tool for redirecting preferences and emotions:

Ethical definitions involve a wedding of descriptive and emotive meaning, and accordingly have a frequent use in redirecting and intensifying attitudes. To choose a definition is to plead a cause, so long as the word defined is strongly emotive.

In persuasive definitions the evaluative component associated with a concept is left unaltered while the descriptive meaning is modified. In this fashion, imprisonment can become "true freedom", and massacres "pacification". Persuasive definitions can change or distort the meaning while keeping the original evaluations that the use of a word evokes. Quasi-definitions consist in the modification of the emotive meaning of a word without altering the descriptive one. The speaker can quasi-define a word by qualifying the definiendum without setting forth what the term actually means. For instance, we can consider the following quasi-definition taken from Casanova's Fuga dai Piombi. In this example (1), the speaker, Mr. Soradaci, tries to convince his interlocutor (Casanova) that being a "sneak" is an honorable behavior:

I have always despised the prejudice that attaches to the name "spy" a hateful meaning: this name sounds bad only to the ears of who hates the Government. A sneak is just a friend of the good of the State, the plague of the crooks, the faithful servant of his Prince.

This quasi-definition employed in the first case underscores a fundamental dimension of the "emotive" meaning of a word, namely its relationship with the shared values, which are attacked as "prejudices." This account given by the spy shows how describing the referent based on a different hierarchy of values can modify emotive meaning. The value of trust is not denied, but is placed in a hierarchy where the highest worth is given to the State.

Stevenson gives two definitions of the word cultured in order to illustrate what a persuasive definition can accomplish:

- The original definition: "widely read and acquainted with arts"
- The persuasive definition: "imaginative sensitivity"

Both carry the positive emotive meaning of culture; it is still a good thing to be cultured by either definition. What they change is what exactly it means to be called "cultured." Because being cultured is a positive trait, the society views being well read and acquainted with the arts as positive traits to have. By promoting a persuasive definition of "imaginative sensitivity", the rhetor intends that the society should view those qualities positively because they are attached to a word with a positive emotive meaning.

Unclear, figurative language is often used in persuasive definitions. Although several techniques can be used to form such a definition, the genus and difference technique is the usual one applied. Both definitions in the taxation example above agree that the genus is a procedure relating to governance but disagree on the difference. Persuasive definitions combine elements of stipulative definitions, lexical definitions, and sometimes theoretical definitions.

Persuasive definitions commonly appear in political speeches, editorials and other situations where the power to influence is most in demand. They have been dismissed as serving only to confuse readers and listeners without legitimate purpose. Critical scrutiny is often necessary to identify persuasive definitions in an argument as they are meant to appear as honest definitions.

== See also ==
- List of fallacies
- Definition
  - Fallacies of definition
- Dogwhistle politics
- Essentially contested concept
- Loaded language
- Poisoning the well
- Stipulative definition
- The Devil's Dictionary

== Sources ==
- Casanova, G. (1911). Historia della mia fuga dalle prigioni della republica di Venezia dette "li Piombi". Milano: Alfieri e Lacroix.
- Copi, Irving M.; Cohen, Carl (1990). Introduction to Logic (8th ed.). New York: Macmillan. ISBN 0-02-946192-8.
- Hurley, Patrick J. (2008). A Concise Introduction to Logic (10th ed.). Belmont, California: Thomson. ISBN 978-0-495-50383-5.
- Huxley, A. (1955) [First published 1936]. Eyeless in Gaza. London: Chatto & Windus.
- Macagno, Fabrizio; Walton, Douglas (2014). Emotive Language in Argumentation. New York: Cambridge University Press. ISBN 9781107676657.
- Orwell, G. (1946). "Politics and the English Language". Horizon. 13 (76): 252–265.
- Stevenson, Charles (1937). "The Emotive Meaning of Ethical Terms" (PDF). Mind. 46: 14–31. doi:10.1093/mind/XLVI.181.14. Archived from the original on 2016-05-23.
- Stevenson, Charles (1938). "Persuasive Definitions". Mind. 47 (187): 331–350. doi:10.1093/mind/xlvii.187.331.
- Stevenson, Charles (1944). Ethics and Language. Connecticut: Yale University Press. LCCN a45001043. OCLC 5184534.
- Walton, Douglas; Macagno, Fabrizio (2015). "The Importance and Trickiness of Definition Strategies in Legal and Political Argumentation". Journal of Politics and Law. 8 (1): 137–148. doi:10.5539/jpl.v8n1p137. hdl:20.500.14776/11607.
