= Ramsey–Lewis method =

Method for defining terms found in theoretical frameworks

The Ramsey–Lewis method is a method for defining terms found in theoretical frameworks (such as in scientific theories), credited to mathematician Frank P. Ramsey and philosopher David K. Lewis. By using this method, a set of theoretical terms appearing in a theory can be defined implicitly by the assertions of the theory itself.

== Overview ==
A scientific theory which attempts to describe "electrons" is inherently abstract, as no one has ever observed an electron directly. Thus, the origin and content of the concept of "electron" is questionable. What does the word exactly signify? Ramsey and Lewis proposed that the meaning of the term "electron" is implicitly generated by the scientific theory that describes it, via all its assertions about electrons. Electrons are those things about which all the statements of the theory are true.

However, some of those statements in a theory refer to other unobserved entities and properties such as "charge" or "spin". For instance, "Electrons attract protons" and "Electrons have negative charge" employ the terms "protons" and "negative charge" (with the latter also implicitly using the concept of "charge"). These properties are formalized, statements (such as conditionals) are formed using them, and those statements taken together are the definition of the term.

Consider a sentence such as "There's an electron in the sink." This means something along the lines of: "There exist some properties P_{1}, P_{2}, ..., P_{n} ( one for every theoretical property involved in the scientific theory, with 'electronhood' (which roughly corresponds to the essence of an electron included as P_{1}) such that... (a statement in the scientific theory, but with P_{1}, ..., P_{n} substituted for the specific terms such as 'charge', 'is an electron', etc. employed by the theory), and there is something in the sink that has P_{1}."

The process of converting the narrative form of a scientific theory into second-order logic is commonly called "Ramsification" (sometimes also spelled "Ramseyfication").

Example: Suppose there are only three principles in our scientific theory about electrons (those principles can be seen to be statements involving the properties):

A1. Electrons (things that have P1) have charge (P2).

A2. Things with charge (P2) tickle you.

A3. Electrons (things that have P1) cause lightning.

Furthermore, we include the property of "electronhood", as outlined above, to be designated by P_{1}, and the property of "charge" to be designated by P_{2}.

Then the meaning of a sentence such as "I have an electron in my pocket" is Ramsified into:

"There are properties P_{1} and P_{2} such that (things with P_{1} also have P_{2}, and things with P_{2} tickle you, and things with P_{1} cause lightning, and there is a thing with P_{1} in my pocket)." (Toraldo di Francia 1981, p. 74, who cites Ramsey 2013.)

== Sources ==
- Toraldo di Francia, Giuliano (1981), "2. The physics of the reversible §2.8 Do magnetic charges exist?", The Investigation of the Physical World, Cambridge: Cambridge University Press, p. 74, ISBN 0-521-29925-X, "... At this point, we can mention a procedure, usually named after F.P. Ramsey (Ramsey, 1954; see also Sneed, 1971, Chaps, 3 and 4). We should also try to discuss only the gist of the procedure rather than all the technical details. Every time a theoretical term appears in a theory one should substitute a variable x for it, and the theory should be preceded by the expression "there exists a certain thing x, such that.""
  - Originally published as — (1976), L'Indagine del Mondo Fisico, Nuova biblioteca scientifica Einaudi, Giulio Einaudi, ISBN 9788806447502, OCLC 762196245
- Lewis, David (1970), "How to define theoretical terms", Journal of Philosophy, 67 (13): 426–446, doi:10.2307/2023861, JSTOR 2023861
- Ramsey, Frank P. (2013) [1931], The Foundations of Mathematics, Taylor & Francis, ISBN 978-1-134-52810-3 as cited by Toraldo di Francia 1981, p. 74
