= Grid-Enabled Measures =

Grid-Enabled Measures (GEM) is an initiative of the National Institutes of Health (NIH) National Cancer Institute (NCI). GEM is a web-based collaborative platform and database enabling researchers to exchange harmonized data about behavioral constructs, measures, and datasets.

GEM has two goals:

1. "Promote use of standardized measures which are tied to theoretically based constructs" and
2. "Facilitate sharing of harmonized data resulting from the use of standardized measures".

GEM has been proposed as part of the solution to the problem of tracking constructs in electronic medical records and for control of construct proliferation.

GEM has been recognized in the academic literature as an instantiation of cyberinfrastructure for research standardization, a tool for dialogue and consensus building, a tool to facilitate use of linked data and interoperable data systems, and in case reports of expert panel measure categorizations. The GEM database, uses “web 2.0” functionality to solicit, comment, vet, and select measures from the behavioral and population science communities in open and transparent ways. Scientists are taking advantage of information sharing and collaboration made possible by networking technologies. This new phenomenon is referred to by some as Science 2.0. As Science 2.0 gains momentum in the science community, giving a glimpse of future scientific publishing and data sharing, the GEM database is distinct in that it uses these functionalities to help scientists facilitate discovery in a massively connected and participative environment.
