= Precising definition =

Definition reducing a word's scope for some purpose

A precising definition is a definition that makes a correct definition more precise. For example, a dictionary may define the term "student" as "1. anyone attending an educational institution of any type, or 2. anyone who studies something." However, a movie theater may propose a precising definition for the word "student" of "any person under the age of 18 enrolled in a local school" in order to determine who is eligible to receive discounted tickets.

Precising definitions are generally used in contexts where vagueness is unacceptable; many legal definitions are precising definitions, as are company policies. This type of definition is useful in preventing disputes that arise from the involved parties using different definitions of the term in question.

A precising definition is intended to make a vague word more precise so that the word's meaning is not left to the interpretation of the reader or listener. Here is an example:

From a class syllabus: "Class participation" means attending class, listening attentively, answering and asking questions, and participating in class discussions.

This is similar to a stipulative definition, but differs in that a stipulative definition may contradict the lexical definition, while a precising definition does not.

== See also ==
- Persuasive definition
