= Operational definition =

Defining a concept in terms of specific, replicable actions or procedures

An operational definition specifies concrete, replicable procedures designed to represent a construct. In the words of American psychologist Stanley Smith Stevens (1935), "An operation is the performance which we execute in order to make known a concept." For example, an operational definition of "fear" (the construct) often includes measurable physiologic responses that occur in response to a perceived threat. Thus, "fear" might be operationally defined as specified changes in heart rate, electrodermal activity, pupil dilation, and blood pressure.

== Overview ==
An operational definition is designed to model or represent a concept or theoretical definition, also known as a construct. Scientists should describe the operations (procedures, actions, or processes) that define the concept with enough specificity such that other investigators can replicate their research.

Operational definitions are also used to define system states in terms of a specific, publicly accessible process of preparation or validation testing. For example, 100 degrees Celsius may be operationally defined as the process of heating water at sea level until it is observed to boil.

A cake can be operationally defined by a cake recipe.

== Application ==
Despite the controversial philosophical origins of the concept, particularly its close association with logical positivism, operational definitions have undisputed practical applications. This is especially so in the social and medical sciences, where operational definitions of key terms are used to preserve the unambiguous empirical testability of hypothesis and theory. Operational definitions are also important in the physical sciences.

=== Philosophy ===
The Stanford Encyclopedia of Philosophy entry on scientific realism, written by Richard Boyd, indicates that the modern concept owes its origin in part to Percy Williams Bridgman, who felt that the expression of scientific concepts was often abstract and unclear. Inspired by Ernst Mach, in 1914 Bridgman attempted to redefine unobservable entities concretely in terms of the physical and mental operations used to measure them. Accordingly, the definition of each unobservable entity was uniquely identified with the instrumentation used to define it. From the beginning objections were raised to this approach, in large part around the inflexibility. As Boyd notes, "In actual, and apparently reliable, scientific practice, changes in the instrumentation associated with theoretical terms are routine. and apparently crucial to the progress of science. According to a 'pure' operationalist conception, these sorts of modifications would not be methodologically acceptable, since each definition must be considered to identify a unique 'object' (or class of objects)."

=== Science ===
The special theory of relativity can be viewed as the introduction of operational definitions for simultaneity of events and of distance, that is, as providing the operations needed to define these terms.

In quantum mechanics the notion of operational definitions is closely related to the idea of observables, that is, definitions based upon what can be measured.

Operational definitions are often most challenging in the fields of psychology and psychiatry, where intuitive concepts, such as intelligence need to be operationally defined before they become amenable to scientific investigation, for example, through processes such as IQ tests.

=== Business ===
On October 15, 1970, the West Gate Bridge in Melbourne, Australia collapsed, killing 35 construction workers. The subsequent enquiry found that the failure arose because engineers had specified the supply of a quantity of flat steel plate. The word flat in this context lacked an operational definition, so there was no test for accepting or rejecting a particular shipment or for controlling quality.

In his managerial and statistical writings, W. Edwards Deming placed great importance on the value of using operational definitions in all agreements in business.

=== General process ===
Operational, in a process context, also can denote a working method or a philosophy that focuses principally on cause and effect relationships (or stimulus/response, behavior, etc.) of specific interest to a particular domain at a particular point in time. As a working method, it does not consider issues related to a domain that are more general, such as the ontological, etc.

=== In computing ===
Science uses computing. Computing uses science. We have seen the development of computer science. There are not many who can bridge all three of these. One effect is that, when results are obtained using a computer, the results can be impossible to replicate if the code is poorly documented, contains errors, or if parts are omitted entirely.

Many times, issues are related to persistence and clarity of use of variables, functions, and so forth. Also, systems dependence is an issue. In brief, length (as a standard) has matter as its definitional basis. What pray tell can be used when standards are to be computationally framed?

Hence, operational definition can be used within the realm of the interactions of humans with advanced computational systems. In this sense, one area of discourse deals with computational thinking in, and with how it might influence, the sciences. To quote the American Scientist:

- The computer revolution has profoundly affected how we think about science, experimentation, and research.

One referenced project pulled together fluid experts, including some who were expert in the numeric modeling related to computational fluid dynamics, in a team with computer scientists. Essentially, it turned out that the computer guys did not know enough to weigh in as much as they would have liked. Thus, their role, to their chagrin, many times was "mere" programmer.

Some knowledge-based engineering projects experienced similarly that there is a trade-off between trying to teach programming to a domain expert versus getting a programmer to understand the intricacies of a domain. That, of course, depends upon the domain. In short, any team member has to decide which side of the coin to spend one's time.

The International Society for Technology in Education has a brochure detailing an "operational definition" of computational thinking. At the same time, the ISTE made an attempt at defining related skills.

A recognized skill is tolerance for ambiguity and being able to handle open-ended problems. For instance, a knowledge-based engineering system can enhance its operational aspect and thereby its stability through more involvement by the subject-matter expert, thereby opening up issues of limits that are related to being human. As in, many times, computational results have to be taken at face value due to several factors (hence the duck test's necessity arises) that even an expert cannot overcome. The end proof may be the final results (reasonable facsimile by simulation or artifact, working design, etc.) that are not guaranteed to be repeatable, may have been costly to attain (time and money), and so forth.

In advanced modeling, with the requisite computational support such as knowledge-based engineering, mappings must be maintained between a real-world object, its abstracted counterparts as defined by the domain and its experts, and the computer models. Mismatches between domain models and their computational mirrors can raise issues apropos this topic. Techniques that allow the flexible modeling required for many hard problems must resolve issues of identity, type, etc. which then lead to methods, such as duck typing. Many domains, with a numerical focus, use limit theory, of various sorts, to overcome the duck test necessity with varying degrees of success. Yet, with that, issues still remain as representational frameworks bear heavily on what we can know.

In arguing for an object-based methodology, Peter Wegner suggested that "positivist scientific philosophies, such as operationalism in physics and behaviorism in psychology" were powerfully applied in the early part of the 20th century. However, computation has changed the landscape. He notes that we need to distinguish four levels of "irreversible physical and computational abstraction" (Platonic abstraction, computational approximation, functional abstraction, and value computation). Then, we must rely on interactive methods, that have behavior as their focus (see duck test).

== Examples ==
=== Temperature ===
The thermodynamics definition of temperature, developed by Nicolas Leonard Sadi Carnot, relies on the theoretical heat flow between infinite thermal reservoirs. Because this definition is theoretical, temperature is operationally defined using primary measurement standards, such as the gas thermometer. Because gas thermometer are complex instruments typically restricted to national standardization laboratories, practical temperature measurements rely on defined international scales, such as the International Temperature Scale of 1990 (ITS -90).

For day-to-day use, the International Temperature Scale of 1990 (ITS) is used, defining temperature in terms of characteristics of the several specific sensor types required to cover the full range. One such is the electrical resistance of a thermistor, with specified construction, calibrated against operationally defined fixed points.

=== Electric current ===
Electric current is defined in terms of the force between two infinite parallel conductors, separated by a specified distance. This definition is too abstract for practical measurement, so a device known as a current balance is used to define the ampere operationally.

=== Mechanical hardness ===
Unlike temperature and electric current, there is no abstract physical concept of the hardness of a material. It is a slightly vague, subjective idea, somewhat like the idea of intelligence. In fact, it leads to three more specific ideas:

1. Scratch hardness measured on Mohs' scale;
2. Indentation hardness; and
3. Rebound, or dynamic, hardness measured with a Shore scleroscope.

Of these, indentation hardness itself leads to many operational definitions, the most important of which are:

1. Brinell hardness test – using a 10 mm steel ball;
2. Vickers hardness test – using a pyramidal diamond indenter; and
3. Rockwell hardness test – using a diamond cone indenter.

In all these, a process is defined for loading the indenter, measuring the resulting indentation, and calculating a hardness number. Each of these three sequences of measurement operations produces numbers that are consistent with our subjective idea of hardness. The harder the material to our informal perception, the greater the number it will achieve on our respective hardness scales. Furthermore, experimental results obtained using these measurement methods has shown that the hardness number can be used to predict the stress required to permanently deform steel, a characteristic that fits in well with our idea of resistance to permanent deformation. However, there is not always a simple relationship between the various hardness scales. Vickers and Rockwell hardness numbers exhibit qualitatively different behaviour when used to describe some materials and phenomena.

=== The constellation Virgo ===
The constellation Virgo is a specific constellation of stars in the sky, hence the process of forming Virgo cannot be an operational definition, since it is historical and not repeatable. Nevertheless, the process whereby we locate Virgo in the sky is repeatable, so in this way, Virgo is operationally defined. In fact, Virgo can have any number of definitions (although we can never prove that we are talking about the same Virgo), and any number may be operational.

=== Academic discipline ===
New academic disciplines appear in response to interdisciplinary activity at universities. An academic suggested that a subject matter area becomes a discipline when there are more than a dozen university departments using the same name for roughly the same subject matter.

== Theoretical vs operational definition ==
Theoretical definition	Operational definition
Weight: a measurement of gravitational force acting on an object	a result of measurement of an object on a newton spring scale

== See also ==
- Duck test
- Operationalization
- Pragmatic maxim
- Pragmaticism
- Pragmatism
- Theoretical/ Conceptual definition
