= Fallacies of definition =

Ways in which a term may be poorly defined

Fallacies of definition are the various ways in which definitions can fail to explain terms. The phrase is used to suggest an analogy with an informal fallacy. Definitions may fail to have merit, because they are overly broad, overly narrow, or incomprehensible; or they use obscure or ambiguous language, contain mutually exclusive parts, or (perhaps most commonly) are circular.

== Circularity ==
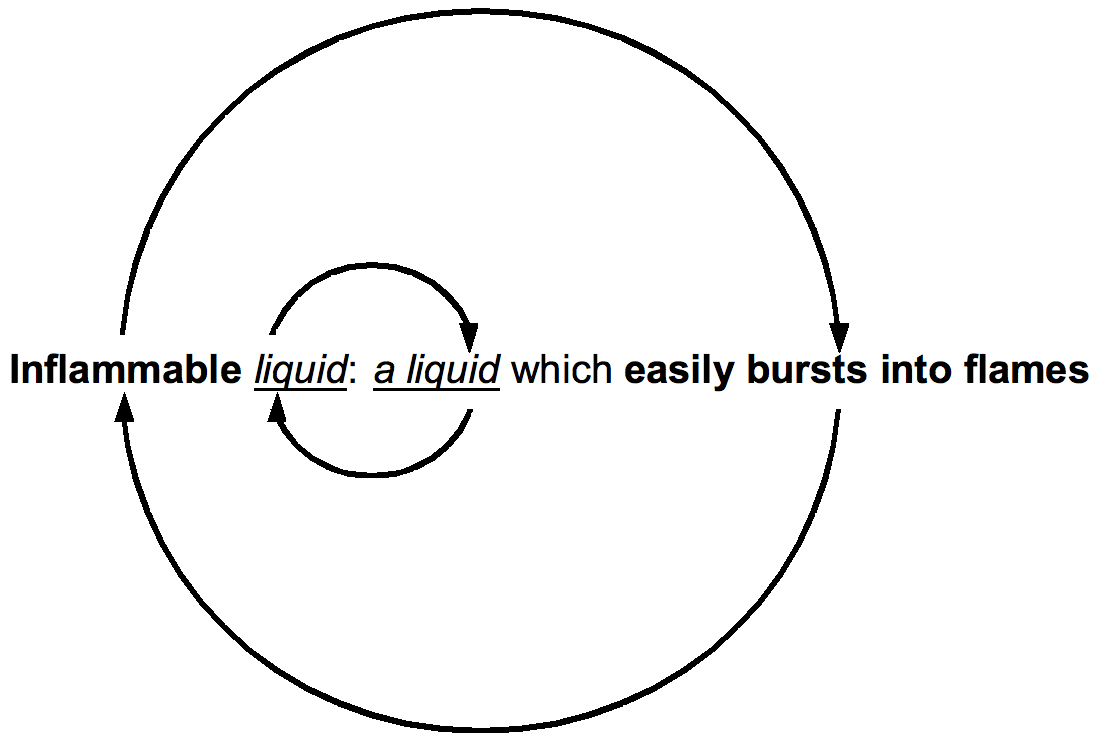
Circular definition of inflammable liquid

If one concept is defined by another, and the other is defined by the first, this is known as a circular definition, akin to circular reasoning: neither offers enlightenment about what one wanted to know. "It is a fallacy because by using a synonym in the definiens the reader is told nothing significantly new."

== Incongruity: overly broad or narrow ==
A definition intended to describe a given set of individuals fails if its description of matching individuals is incongruous: too broad (excessively loose with parameters) or too narrow (excessively strict with parameters). For example, "a shape with four sides of equal length" is not a sufficient definition for square, because squares are not the only shapes that can have four sides of equal length; rhombi do as well. Likewise, defining rectangle as "a shape with four perpendicular sides of equal length" is inappropriate because it is too narrow, as it describes only squares while excluding all other kinds of rectangles, thus being a plainly incorrect definition.

If a cow were defined as an animal with horns, this would be overly broad (including goats, for example), while if a cow were defined as a black-and-white quadruped, this would be both overly narrow (excluding: all-black, all-white, all-brown and white-brown cows, for example) and overly broad (including Dalmatians, for example).

== Obscurity ==
Definitions can go wrong by using ambiguous, obscure, or figurative language. This can lead to circular definitions. Definitions should be defined in the most prosaic form of language to be understood, as failure to elucidate provides fallacious definitions. Figurative language can also be misinterpreted. For example, golden eyes in a biography may lead the reader to think that the person was fictional.

An example of obscurity is Samuel Johnson's definition for oats: "A grain, which in England is generally given to horses, but in Scotland supports the people." The thing defined (oats) should be pointed out rather than remain obscure.

== Mutual exclusivity ==
The definition completely excludes what is being defined. For example, a cow might be defined as a flying animal with no legs. In reality a cow has legs and cannot fly, but this example claims to define a cow using a definition that is opposite to what a cow actually is. "Cow" and "flying animal with no legs" are mutually exclusive to each other: they cannot refer to the same thing.

== Self-contradictory requirements ==
Definitions may fail by imposing conflicting requirements, making it impossible for them to apply to anything at all. For example, a cow being defined as a legless quadruped. These requirements may also be mutually exclusive.

== Definist fallacy ==
The definist fallacy is a logical fallacy, coined by William Frankena in 1939 in a critique of the "naturalistic fallacy", that involves the definition of one property in terms of a non-synonym.

== See also ==
- Equivocation – Misleading use of a term with multiple meanings
- Fallacy – Argument that uses faulty reasoning
- Fallacy of division
- Fallacy of equivocation – Misleading use of a term with multiple meanings
- Fallacies of inference – Conclusion made on the basis of one or few instances of a phenomenon
- Formal fallacy – Faulty deductive reasoning due to a logical flaw
- Inscrutability of reference – Philosophical thesis by Willard Van Orman Quine
- Persuasive definition – Stipulative, biased definition of a term
