= Circular definition =

Self-referential description of meaning

Circular definition of "circular definition"

A circular definition is a type of definition that uses the term(s) being defined as part of the description or assumes that the term(s) being described are already known. There are several kinds of circular definition, and several ways of characterising the term: pragmatic, lexicographic and linguistic. Circular definitions are related to circular reasoning in that they both involve a self-referential approach.

Circular definitions may be unhelpful if the audience must either already know the meaning of the key term, or if the term to be defined is used in the definition itself.

In linguistics, a circular definition is a description of the meaning of a lexeme that is constructed using one or more synonymous lexemes that are all defined in terms of each other.

== Approaches to characterizing circular definitions ==
=== Classical ===
In Plato's Meno, several definitions of virtue are offered, the third of which states that virtue is the power of attaining good justly or with justice, where justice has already been defined as a form or aspect of virtue. Socrates, in response to Meno, states that the process of finding a definition will have to be started again because the wording offered defines virtue as a part of virtue.

=== Pragmatic ===
From a pragmatic point of view, circular definitions may be characterised in terms of new, useful or helpful information: a definition is deficient if the audience must either already know the meaning of the key term, or if the term to be defined is used in the definition itself. Such definitions lead to a need for additional information that motivated someone to look at the definition in the first place and, thus, violate the principle of providing new or useful information. Here are some examples:

- Suppose we define "oak" as a tree which has catkins and grows from an acorn, and then define "acorn" as the nut produced by an oak tree. To someone who does not know which trees are oaks, nor which nuts are acorns, the definition is inadequate.
- If someone wants to know what a cellular phone is, telling them that it is a "phone that is cellular" will not be especially illuminating. Much more helpful would be to explain the concept of a cell in the context of telecommunications, or at least to make some reference to portability.
- Defining "man/woman" as "someone who identifies as a man/woman" is explicitly circular.
- Similarly, defining dialectical materialism as "materialism that involves dialectic" is unhelpful.

Consequently, when constructing systems of definitions, authors should use good practices that avoid producing viciously circular definitions. In many learner's dictionaries, circular definitions are greatly reduced by writing definitions using only the words in a constrained defining vocabulary.

=== Lexicographic ===
From a lexicographic point of view, the simplest form of circular definition in a dictionary is in terms of synonyms, and the number of steps for closing the definition chain into a circle is known as the depth of the circular definition: the circular definition "object: a thing" → "thing: an object" is a circular definition with a depth of two. The circular definition "object: a thing" → "thing: an entity" → "entity: an object" has a depth of three.

"Four legs" is a simple example of differentia specifica.

The classic "genus-difference" dictionary definition is in terms of nearest kind (genus proximum) and specific differences (differentia specifica). This genus-difference description may be involved in producing circular definitions of part and kind relationships, for example: "rake: an implement with three or more tines" → "tine: a part of a rake". However, if more specific differences are added, then the effect of circularity may disappear: "rake: a gardening implement with a long handle with three or more tines arranged on crossbar at 90° to the handle and the tines at 90° to both crossbar and handle"; in this case, "tine" is most usefully defined with reference to "rake", but with additional differences providing points of comparison, e.g.: "tine: a sharp spike at the end of a rake". In practice, a pragmatic approach is often taken in considering the effects of circularity in dictionary definitions.

==== Circular lexicographic (dictionary) definitions ====
Dictionary entries are often given as examples of apparent circular definitions. Dictionary production, as a project in lexicography, should not be confused with a mathematical or logical activity, where giving a definition for a word is similar to providing an explanans for an explanandum in a context where practitioners are expected to use a deductive system. While, from a linguistic prescriptivist perspective, any dictionary might be believed to dictate correct usage, the linguistic descriptivist perspective recognizes that looking up words in dictionaries is not itself a rule-following practice independent of the give-and-take of using words in context. Thus, the example of a definition of oak given above (something that has catkins and grows from acorns) is not completely useless, even if "acorn" and "catkin" are defined in terms of "oak", in that it supplies additional concepts (e.g., the concept of catkin) in the definition.

While a dictionary might produce a "circle" among the terms, "oak", "catkin", and "acorn", each of these is used in different contexts (e.g., those related to plants, trees, flowers, and seeds) that generate ever-branching networks of usages. In another case it might produce a true circle. Taken as a whole, dictionaries are circular because each and every word is defined in terms of words that are also contained within the dictionary. (A person could not pick up a (foreign) dictionary and make any sense of it unless they already know the meaning of a minimal subset of a number of words without having the need to refer to the dictionary for said meaning.)

A circular definition crept into the classic definition of death that was once "the permanent cessation of the flow of vital bodily fluids", which raised the question "what makes a fluid vital?"

Definitions in lexicography can be broadly or narrowly circular. Narrowly circular definitions simply define one word in terms of another. A broadly circular definition has a larger circle of words. For example, the definition of the primary word is defined using two other words, which are defined with two other words, etc., creating a definitional chain. This can continue until the primary word is used to define one of the words used in the chain, closing the wide circle of terms. If all definitions rely on the definitions of other words in a very large, but finite chain, then all text-based definitions are ultimately circular. Extension (semantics) to the actual things that referring terms like nouns stand for, provided that agreement on reference is accomplished, is one method of breaking this circularity, but this is outside the capacity of a text-based definition.

==== Examples of narrowly circular definitions in dictionaries ====
The 2007 Merriam-Webster dictionary defines a "hill" and a "mountain" this way:

hill - "1: a usually rounded natural elevation of land lower than a mountain"
mountain - "1a: a landmass that projects conspicuously above its surroundings and is higher than a hill"

Merriam-Webster's online dictionary provides another example of a circular definition with the words "condescending" and "patronizing:"

Main Entry: condescending
Function: adjective
1 : showing or characterized by condescension: patronizing

From "condescension":

Main Entry: condescension
Function: noun
1 : voluntary descent from one's rank or dignity in relations with an inferior
2 : patronizing attitude or behavior

To "patronize":

Main Entry: patronize
Function: transitive verb
1 : to act as patron of: provide aid or support for
2 : to adopt an air of condescension toward: treat haughtily or coolly

From the Oxford Dictionary of English:

- Punishment – "a penalty inflicted as retribution for an offence".
- Penalty – "a punishment imposed for breaking a law, rule, or contract".
- Retribution – "punishment inflicted on someone as vengeance for a wrong or criminal act".
- Vengeance – "punishment inflicted or retribution exacted for an injury or wrong".

Therefore, a punishment means "a punishment imposed for breaking a law, rule, or contract inflicted as punishment inflicted on someone as punishment inflicted or retribution exacted for an injury or wrong for a wrong or criminal act for an offence". Obviously, this is not the final result of substitution as this would result in an endlessly long sentence.

The 2015 Cambridge online dictionary defines “suffering” as a noun in British English as "physical or mental pain that a person or animal is feeling:" and in American English as "physical or mental pain:", but then defines pain as a noun in British English as "a feeling of physical suffering caused by injury or illness:" or "emotional or mental suffering:".

As well, the 2015 Cambridge online dictionary uses the following three adjective definitions in British English:

- Living = alive now
- Alive = living, not dead
- Dead = not now living

This means living's definition of "alive now" can be expanded to "living, not dead now", further expanded to "living, not not now living", and continue to expand ad infinitum.

== Mathematical theory ==
Formal approaches to characterizing circular definitions are found in logic, mathematics and in computer science. A branch of mathematics called non-well-founded set theory allows for the construction of circular sets. Circular sets are good for modelling cycles, and, despite the field's name, this area of mathematics is well founded. Computer science allows for procedures to be defined by using recursion. Such definitions are not circular as long as they terminate.

== Linguistics ==
Linguistically, a circular definition is a description of the meaning of a lexeme that is constructed using one or more synonymous lexemes that are all defined in terms of each other.

== See also ==
- Begging the question
- Circular reasoning
- Fallacies of definition
- Genus–differentia definition
- Infinite regress
- Lexicography
- Lexical definition
- Meta-circular evaluator
- Self-reference
- Self-refuting idea
- Recursive definition
- Revision theory
- Tautology
- Vicious circle principle
