= Theoretical definition =

Definition of a word based on theories on its nature

A theoretical definition defines a term in an academic discipline, functioning as a proposal to see a phenomenon in a certain way. A theoretical definition is a proposed way of thinking about potentially related events. Theoretical definitions contain built-in theories; they cannot be simply reduced to describing a set of observations. The definition may contain implicit inductions and deductive consequences that are part of the theory. A theoretical definition of a term can change, over time, based on the methods in the field that created it.

Without a falsifiable operational definition, conceptual definitions assume both knowledge and acceptance of the theories that it depends on. A hypothetical construct may serve as a theoretical definition, as can a stipulative definition.

== In different fields ==
=== Sciences ===
The term scientific theory is reserved for concepts that are widely accepted. A scientific law often refers to regularities that can be expressed by a mathematical statement. However, there is no consensus about the distinction between these terms. Every scientific concept must have an operational definition, however the operational definition can use both direct observations and latent variables.

==== Natural sciences ====
In the natural sciences, a concept is an abstract conclusion drawn from observations.

==== Social and health sciences ====
Social and health sciences interact with non-empirical fields and use both observation based and pre-existing concepts such as intelligence, race, and gender.

- In psychology the term "conceptual definition" is used for a concept variable.

=== Interdisciplinary ===
Most interdisciplinary fields are designed to address specific real world concerns and the status of theoretical definitions in interdisciplinary fields is still evolving.

== Examples ==
Theoretical or Conceptual definition	Operational definition
Weight: a measurement of gravitational force acting on an object	a result of measurement of an object on a Newton spring scale

=== In natural science ===
The definitions of substances as various configurations of atoms are theoretical definitions, as are definitions of colors as specific wavelengths of reflected light.

==== Physics ====
The first postulate of special relativity theory that the speed of light in vacuum is the same to all inertial observers (i.e. it is a constant, and therefore a good measure of length). Of interest, this theoretical concept is the basis of an operational definition for the length of a metre is "the distance traveled by light in a vacuum during a time interval of 1/299,792,458 of a second". Thus we have defined 'metre' according to other ideas contained in modern scientific theory. Rejection of the theory underlying a theoretical definition leaves the definition invalid for use in argument with those who reject it — neither side will advance its position by using terms the others do not accept.

Heat explains a collection of various laws of nature and that predict certain results.

=== In social science ===
==== Union ====
In psychology, the concept of intelligence is meant to explain correlations in performance on certain cognitive tasks. Recent models suggest several cognitive processes may be involved in tasks that have been associated with intelligence. However, overall the "g" or general intelligence factor is relatively supported by research, though there are challenges.

=== Philosophy ===
Differing theoretical definitions of "thinking" have caused conflict amongst artificial intelligence philosophers, illustrated for example by the different responses to the Chinese room experiment. Some philosophers might call "thought" merely "having the ability to convince another person that you can think". An operational definition corresponding to this theoretical definition could be a simple conversation test (e.g. Turing test). Others believe that better theoretical and operational definitions are required.

== See also ==
- Construct (philosophy)
- General Conference on Weights and Measures
- International Committee for Weights and Measures
- Latent variable
- Operational definition
- Stipulative definitions
