= Faith =

Belief in the teachings of a religion

In religion, faith is the "belief in God or in the doctrines or teachings of religion".

Religious people often think of faith as confidence based on a perceived degree of warrant, or evidence, while others who are more skeptical of religion tend to think of faith as belief without evidence.

According to Thomas Aquinas, faith is "an act of the intellect assenting to the truth at the command of the will". Religion has a long tradition, since the ancient world, of analyzing divine questions using common human experiences such as sensation, reason, science, and history that do not rely on revelation—called natural theology.

== Etymology ==
The English word faith finds its roots in the Proto-Indo-European (PIE) root *bheidh-, signifying concepts of trust, confidence, and persuasion. This root has given rise to various terms across different languages, such as Greek πίστις (pístis), meaning "faith", and Latin fidēs, meaning "trust", "faith", "confidence".

Furthermore, the Proto-Indo-European root *were-o- adds another layer to the word's etymology, emphasizing the notions of truth and trustworthiness. This root is evident in English words like veracity, verity, and verify, as well as in Latin with verus, meaning "true".

The term faith in English emerged in the mid-13th century, evolving from Anglo-French and Old French forms like feid and feit, ultimately tracing back to the Latin fidēs. This Latin term, rooted in the PIE root *bheidh-, encompassed meanings such as trust, confidence, and belief.

More generally, "faith" is confidence or trust in a person, thing, or concept. According to the Merriam-Webster's Dictionary, faith has multiple definitions, including "something that is believed especially with strong conviction", "complete trust", "belief and trust in and loyalty to God", as well as "a firm belief in something for which there is no proof".

In the Roman world, 'faith' (Latin: fides) was understood without particular association with gods or beliefs. Instead, it was understood as a paradoxical set of reciprocal ideas: voluntary will and voluntary restraint in the sense of father over family or host over guest, whereby one party willfully surrenders to a party who could harm but chooses not to, thereby entrusting or confiding in them.

== By religion ==
Referring to "religions" (plural), Pope Francis claimed that "the majority of people living on our planet profess to be believers".

=== Christianity ===
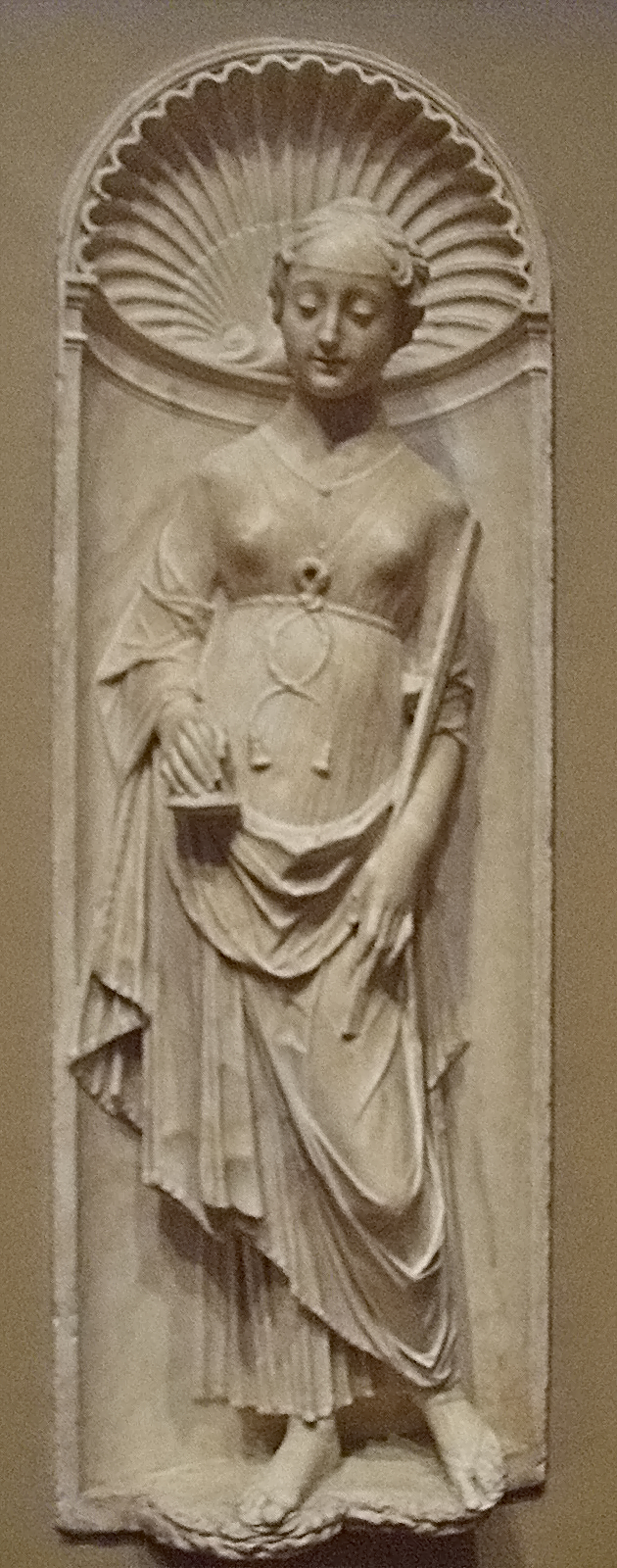
Faith (Armani), by Mino da Fiesole

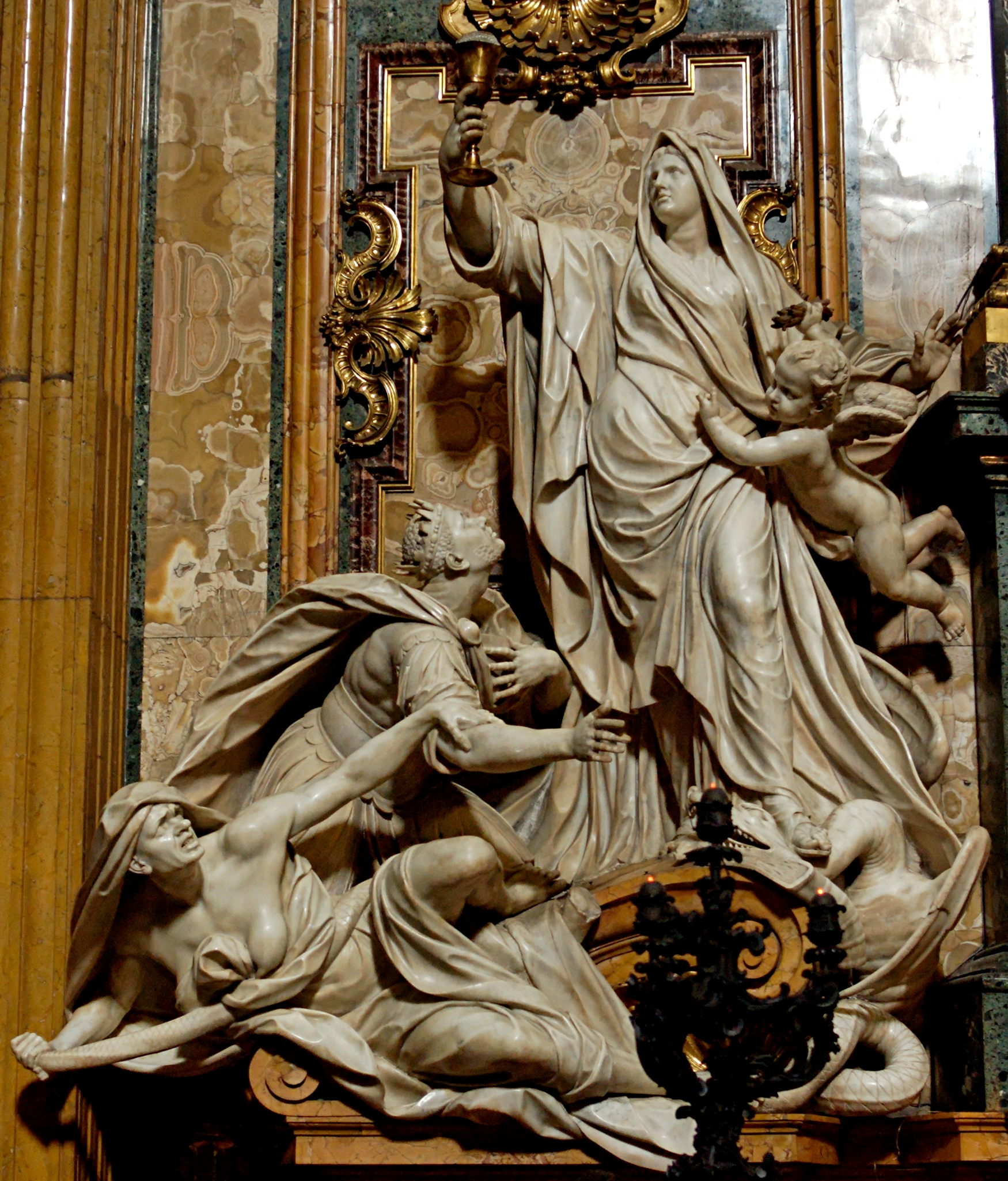
Triumph of Faith over Idolatry by Jean-Baptiste Théodon

The word translated as "faith" in English-language editions of the New Testament, the Greek word πίστις (pístis), can also be translated as "belief", "faithfulness", or "trust". Faith can also be translated from the Greek verb πιστεύω (pisteuo), meaning "to trust, to have confidence, faithfulness, to be reliable, to assure". Christianity encompasses various views regarding the nature of faith. Some see faith as being persuaded or convinced that something is true. In this view, a person believes something when they are presented with adequate evidence that it is true. The 13th-century theologian Saint Thomas Aquinas did not hold that faith is mere opinion: on the contrary, he held that it represents a mean (understood in the Aristotelian sense) between excessive reliance on science (i.e., demonstration) and excessive reliance on opinion.

According to Teresa Morgan, faith was understood by early Christians within the cultural milieu of the period as a relationship that created a community based on trust, instead of a set of mental beliefs or feelings of the heart.

Numerous commentators discuss the results of faith. Some believe that true faith results in good works, while others believe that while faith in Jesus brings eternal life, it does not necessarily result in good works.

Regardless of the approach taken to faith, all Christians agree that the Christian faith (in the sense of Christian practice) is aligned with the ideals and the example of the life of Jesus. The Christian contemplates the mystery of God and his grace and seeks to know and become obedient to God. To a Christian, the faith is not static, but causes one to learn more of God and to grow in faith; Christian faith has its origin in God.

In Christianity, faith causes change as it seeks a greater understanding of God. According to the author of the New Testament book of Hebrews, faith precedes understanding. Understanding comes after believing.Hebrews 11:3 Faith is not fideism or simple obedience to a set of rules or statements. Before Christians have faith, but they must also understand in whom and in what they have faith. Without understanding, there cannot be true faith, and that understanding is built on the foundation of the community of believers, the scriptures and traditions, and on the personal experiences of the believer.

==== Strength of faith ====
Christians may recognize different degrees of faith when they encourage each other to, and themselves strive to, develop, grow, or deepen their faith. This may imply that one can measure faith. Willingness to undergo martyrdom indicates a proxy for the depth of faith but does not provide an everyday measurement for the average contemporary Christian. Within the Calvinist tradition, the degree of prosperity may serve as an analog of the level of faith. Other Christian strands may rely on personal self-evaluation to measure the intensity of an individual's faith, with associated difficulties in calibrating to any scale. Solemn affirmations of a creed (a statement of faith) provide broad measurements of details. Various tribunals of the Inquisition, however, concerned themselves with precisely evaluating the orthodoxy of the faith of those it examined, to acquit or to punish in varying degrees.

The classification of different degrees of faith allows that faith and its expression may wax and wane in fervor, during the lifetime of a faithful individual or over the various historical centuries of a society with an embedded religious system. Thus, one can speak of an "Age of Faith" or of the "decay" of a society's religiosity into corruption, secularism, or atheism,—interpretable as the ultimate loss of faith.

==== Christian apologetic views ====
In contrast to Richard Dawkins' view of faith as "blind trust, in the absence of evidence, even in the teeth of evidence", Alister McGrath quotes the Oxford Anglican theologian W. H. Griffith Thomas (1861–1924), who states that faith is "not blind, but intelligent" and that it "commences with the conviction of the mind based on adequate evidence...", which McGrath sees as "a good and reliable definition, synthesizing the core elements of the characteristic Christian understanding of faith".

American biblical scholar Archibald Thomas Robertson (1863–1934) stated that the Greek word pistis used for "faith" in the New Testament (over two hundred forty times), and rendered "assurance" in Acts 17:31, is "an old verb meaning 'to furnish', used regularly by Demosthenes for bringing forward evidence." Tom Price (Oxford Centre for Christian Apologetics) affirms that when the New Testament talks about faith positively it only uses words derived from the Greek root [pistis] which means "to be persuaded".

British Christian apologist John Lennox argues that "faith conceived as a belief that lacks warrant is very different from faith conceived as a belief that has warrant". He states, "the use of the adjective 'blind' to describe 'faith' indicates that faith is not necessarily, or always, or indeed normally, blind". "The validity, or warrant, of faith or belief depends on the strength of the evidence on which the belief is based." "We all know how to distinguish between blind faith and evidence-based faith. We are well aware that faith is only justified if there is evidence to back it up." "Evidence-based faith is the normal concept on which we base our everyday lives."

Peter S. Williams holds that "the classic Christian tradition has always valued rationality and does not hold that faith involves the complete abandonment of reason while believing in the teeth of evidence". Quoting Moreland, faith is defined as "a trust in and commitment to what we have reason to believe is true".

Regarding doubting Thomas in John 20:24–31, Williams points out that "Thomas wasn't asked to believe without evidence. He was asked to believe based on the other disciples' testimony. Thomas initially lacked the first-hand experience of the evidence that had convinced them... Moreover, the reason John gives for recounting these events is that what he saw is evidence... Jesus did many other miraculous signs in the presence of his disciples... But these are written that you may believe that Jesus is the Christ, the son of God, and that believing ye might have life in his name. John 20:30–31."

Concerning doubting Thomas, Michael R. Allen wrote: "Thomas's definition of faith implies adherence to conceptual propositions for the sake of personal knowledge, knowledge of and about a person qua person".

Kenneth Boa and Robert M. Bowman Jr. describe a classic understanding of faith that is referred to as evidentialism, and which is part of a larger epistemological tradition called classical foundationalism, which is accompanied by deontologism, which holds that humans must regulate their beliefs following evidentialist structures. They show how this can go too far, and Alvin Plantinga deals with it. While Plantinga upholds that faith may be the result of evidence testifying to the reliability of the source (of the truth claims), yet he sees having faith as being the result of hearing the truth of the gospel with the internal persuasion by the Holy Spirit moving and enabling him to believe. "Christian belief is produced in the believer by the internal instigation of the Holy Spirit, endorsing the teachings of Scripture, which is itself divinely inspired by the Holy Spirit. The result of the work of the Holy Spirit is faith."

==== Catholicism ====
The four-part Catechism of the Catholic Church (CCC) devotes Part One to "The Profession of Faith". This section describes the content of faith. It elaborates and expands, particularly upon the Apostles' Creed. CCC 144 initiates a section on the "Obedience of Faith".

In the theology of Pope John Paul II, faith is understood in personal terms as a trusting commitment of person to person and thus involves Christian commitment to the divine person of Jesus Christ.

==== Lutheranism ====
Lutherans believe the Bible teaches that faith is a state of the heart where one acknowledges and trusts the gospel’s promises—God’s forgiveness and eternal life through Jesus Christ:

Through faith we receive the salvation won by Christ and make it our own (John 1:12, Romans 1:16-17, Colossians 2:6-7).

==== Methodism ====
In Methodism, faith plays an important role in justification, which occurs during the New Birth. The Emmanuel Association, a Methodist denomination in the conservative holiness movement, teaches:

Living faith is the gift of God (Ephesians 2:8; Romans 4:16) imparted to the obedient heart through the Word of God (Romans 10:17), and the ministry of the Holy Ghost (Ephesians 2:18). This faith becomes effective as it is exercised by man with the aid of the Spirit, which aid is always assured when the heart has met the divine condition (Hebrews 5:9). Living faith is to be distinguished from intellectual confidence which may be in the possession of any unawakened soul (Romans 10:1–4).

— Principles of Faith, Emmanuel Association of Churches

==== The Church of Jesus Christ of Latter-day Saints ====
The Articles of Faith of the Church of Jesus Christ of Latter-day Saints states that "faith in the Lord Jesus Christ" is the first principle of the gospel.

Some alternative, yet impactful, ideas regarding the nature of faith were presented by church founder Joseph Smith in a collection of sermons, which are now published as the Lectures on Faith.

- Lecture 1 explains what faith is.
- Lecture 2 describes how humankind comes to know about God.
- Lectures 3 and 4 clarify God's necessary and unchanging attributes.
- Lecture 5 deals with the nature of God the Father, his Son Jesus, and the Holy Ghost.
- Lecture 6 proclaims that the willingness to sacrifice all earthly things is a prerequisite to gaining faith in salvation.
- Lecture 7 treats the fruits of faith—perspective, power, and eventually perfection.

=== Buddhism ===
Faith in Buddhism (saddhā, śraddhā) refers to a serene commitment to the practice of the Buddha's teaching and trust in enlightened or highly developed beings, such as Buddhas or bodhisattvas (those aiming to become a Buddha). Buddhists usually recognize multiple objects of faith, but many are especially devoted to one particular object of faith, such as one particular Buddha.

In early Buddhism, faith was focused on the Three Jewels or Refuges—namely, Gautama Buddha, his teaching (the Dhamma), and the community of spiritually developed followers, or the monastic community seeking enlightenment (the Sangha). Although offerings to the monastic community were valued highest, early Buddhism did not morally condemn peaceful offerings to deities. A faithful devotee was called upāsaka or upāsika, for which no formal declaration was required. In early Buddhism, personal verification was valued highest in attaining the truth, and sacred scriptures, reason, or faith in a teacher were considered less valuable sources of authority. As important as faith was, it was a mere initial step to the path to wisdom and enlightenment, and was obsolete or redefined at the final stage of that path.

While faith in Buddhism does not imply "blind faith", Buddhist practice nevertheless requires a degree of trust, primarily in the spiritual attainment of Gautama Buddha. Faith in Buddhism can still be described as faith in the Three Jewels (the Buddha, Dharma, and Sangha). It is intended to lead to the goal of enlightenment, or bodhi, and Nirvana. Volitionally, faith implies a resolute and courageous act of will. It combines the steadfast resolution that one will do a thing with the self-confidence that one can do it.

Faith was given a much more important role in the later stratum of Buddhist history, especially Mahāyāna Buddhism. The concept of the Buddha Nature was developed, as devotion to Buddhas and bodhisattvas residing in Pure Lands became commonplace. With the arising of the cult of the Lotus Sūtra, faith gained a central role in Buddhist practice, which was further amplified with the development of devotion to the Amitabha Buddha in Pure Land Buddhism. In the Japanese form of Pure Land Buddhism, under the teachers Hōnen and Shinran, only entrusting faith toward the Amitabha Buddha was believed to be a fruitful form of practice, as the practice of celibacy, morality, and other Buddhist disciplines were dismissed as no longer effective in this day and age, or as contradicting the virtue of faith. Faith was defined as a state similar to enlightenment, with a sense of self-negation and humility.

Thus, the role of faith increased throughout Buddhist history. However, from the nineteenth century onward, Buddhist modernism in countries like Sri Lanka, Japan, and the West has downplayed and criticized the role of faith in Buddhism. Faith in Buddhism still has a role in modern Asia and the West, but is understood and defined differently than in traditional interpretations. Within the Dalit Buddhist Movement communities, taking refuge is defined not only as a religious, but also a political choice.

=== Hinduism ===
Bhakti (Sanskrit: भक्ति) literally means "attachment, participation, fondness for, homage, faith, love, devotion, worship, purity". It was originally used in Hinduism, referring to devotion and love for a personal god or a representational god by a devotee. In ancient texts such as the Shvetashvatara Upanishad, the term simply means participation, devotion, and love for any endeavor, while in the Bhagavad Gita, it connotes one of the possible paths of spirituality and towards moksha, as in bhakti marga.

Ahimsa, also referred to as nonviolence, is a fundamental tenet of Hinduism that advocates harmonious and peaceful co-existence and evolutionary growth in grace and wisdom for all humankind unconditionally.

=== Islam ===
In Islam, a believer's faith in the metaphysical aspects of Islam is called Iman (Arabic: الإيمان), which is complete submission to the will of God, not unquestioning or naive belief. A man must build his faith on well-grounded convictions beyond any reasonable doubt and above uncertainty. According to the Quran, Iman must be accompanied by righteous deeds and the two together are necessary for entry into Paradise. In the Hadith of Gabriel, Iman in addition to Islam and Ihsan form the three dimensions of the Islamic religion.

Muhammad referred to the six axioms of faith in the Hadith of Gabriel: "Iman is that you believe in God and His Angels and His Books and His Messengers and the Hereafter and the good and evil fate [ordained by your God]." The first five are mentioned together in the Qur'an. The Quran states that faith can grow with remembrance of God. The Qur'an also states that nothing in this world should be dearer to a true believer than faith.

=== Judaism ===
Judaism recognizes the positive value of emunah (generally translated as "faith" or "trust in God") and the negative status of the epikoros (heretic), but faith is not as stressed or as central as it is in some other religions, especially Christianity or Islam—at least insofar as it can be analogized to Judaism. Faith may be a necessary component to the observance of religious Judaism, but there remains an assumption that the emphasis of Judaism is placed on "true" knowledge, "true" prophecy, and correct practice (i.e., orthopraxy) rather than on faith itself. Historically, Jewish faith has not required an individual Jew's assent to a creed (a lá mainstream Christianity) or other structured belief systems to be considered genuine faith. Judaism does not require a Jew to explicitly believe in God (a key tenet of Christian faith, which is termed avodah zarah (foreign worship) in Judaism, a minor form of idolatry). Instead, in Judaism, one is to honor a (personal) conception of God, supported by the many principles quoted in the Talmud to define Judaism (mostly by what it is not). Thus, there is no commonly accepted, established formulation of Jewish principles of faith that are mandatory for observant Jews.

In the Jewish scriptures, trust in God (emunah) refers to how God acts toward his people and how they are to respond to him; it is rooted in the everlasting covenant established in the Torah, notably in Deuteronomy 7:9.

Know therefore that the LORD thy God, He is God; the faithful God, who keepeth covenant and mercy with them that love Him and keep His commandments to a thousand generations;

— Tanakh, Deuteronomy 7:9

The specific tenets that compose required belief and their application to the times have been disputed throughout Jewish history. Today, many, but not all, Orthodox Jews have accepted Maimonides's Thirteen Principles of Belief.

A traditional example of Emunah as seen in the Jewish annals is found in the person of Abraham. On several occasions, Abraham both accepts statements from God that seem impossible and offers obedient actions in response to direction from God to do things that seem implausible.

The Talmud describes how a thief also believes in G‑d: On the brink of his forced entry, as he is about to risk his life—and the life of his victim—he cries out with all sincerity, "G‑d help me!" The thief has faith that there is a G‑d who hears his cries, yet it escapes him that this G‑d may be able to provide for him without requiring that he abrogate G‑d's will by stealing from others. For emunah to affect him in this way he needs study and contemplation.

=== Sikhism ===
Faith is not a religious concept in Sikhism. However, the five Sikh symbols, known as Kakaars or Five Ks (in Punjabi known as pañj kakkē or pañj kakār), are sometimes referred to as the Five articles of Faith. The articles include kēs (uncut hair), kaṅghā (small wooden comb), kaṛā (circular steel or iron bracelet), kirpān (sword/dagger), and kacchera (special undergarment). Baptised Sikhs are bound to wear those five articles of faith, at all times, to save them from bad company and keep them close to God.

=== Baháʼí Faith ===
In the Baháʼí Faith, faith is meant, first, as conscious knowledge, second, as the practice of good deeds, and ultimately as the acceptance of the divine authority of the Manifestations of God. In the religion's view, faith and knowledge are both required for spiritual growth. Faith involves more than outward obedience to this authority, but also must be based on a deep personal understanding of religious teachings.

== Secular faith ==
Secular faith refers to a belief or conviction that is not based on religious or supernatural doctrines. Secular faith can arise from a wide range of sources and can take many forms, depending on the individual's beliefs and experiences, including:

Philosophy
Many secular beliefs are rooted in philosophical ideas, such as humanism or rationalism. These belief systems often emphasize the importance of reason, ethics, and human agency, rather than relying on supernatural or religious explanations. A prime example is the philosopher Immanuel Kant, whose deontological ethical theory has profoundly shaped western secular values from the 18th century onward. He professed a secular faith in reason, writing in the Groundwork of the Metaphysics of Morals that "the true vocation of reason must be to produce a will that is good, not perhaps as a means to other purposes, but good in itself, for which reason was absolutely necessary. This will need not, because of this, be the sole and complete good, but it must still be the highest good and the condition of every other, even of all demands for happiness."
Personal values and principles
People may develop secular faith based on their own values and principles, such as a belief in social justice or environmentalism.
Community and culture
Secular faith can also be influenced by the values and beliefs of a particular community or culture. For example, some people may have faith in the principles of democracy, human rights, or freedom of expression.

== Epistemological analysis ==
The epistemological study focuses on epistemic justification, the rationality of belief, and various related issues. A justified belief is a belief that is well-supported by evidence and reasons, and that is arrived at through a reliable and trustworthy process of inquiry.

Faith is often regarded as a form of belief that may not necessarily rely on empirical evidence. However, when religious faith does make empirical claims, these claims need to undergo scientific testing to determine their validity. On the other hand, some beliefs may not make empirical claims and instead focus on non-empirical issues such as ethics, morality, and spiritual practices. In these cases, it may be necessary to evaluate the validity of these beliefs based on their internal coherence and logical consistency, rather than empirical testing.

There is a wide spectrum of opinion concerning the epistemological validity of faith — that is, whether it is a reliable way to acquire true beliefs.

=== Fideism ===
Fideism is considered to be a philosophical position rather than a comprehensive epistemological theory. It maintains that faith is independent of reason, or that reason and faith are hostile to each other and faith is superior at arriving at particular truths (see natural theology). Fideism is not a synonym for religious belief but describes a particular philosophical proposition concerning the relationship between faith's appropriate jurisdiction at arriving at truths, contrasted against reason. It states that faith is needed to determine some philosophical and religious truths, and it questions the ability of reason to arrive at all truth. The word and concept had its origin in the mid to late-19th century by way of Catholic thought, in a movement called Traditionalism. The Roman Catholic Magisterium has, however, repeatedly condemned fideism.

Critics of fideism suggest that it is not a justified or rational position from an epistemological standpoint. Fideism holds that religious beliefs cannot be justified or evaluated based on evidence or reason and that faith alone is a sufficient basis for belief. This position has been criticized because it leads to dogmatism, irrationality, and a rejection of the importance of reason and evidence in understanding the world.

William Alston argues that while faith is an important aspect of religious belief, it must be grounded in reason and evidence to be justified.

=== Religious epistemology ===
Religious epistemologists formulated and defended reasons for the rationality of accepting belief in God without the support of an argument. Some religious epistemologists hold that belief in God is more analogous to belief in a person than belief in a scientific hypothesis. Human relations demand trust and commitment. If belief in God is more like belief in other persons, then the trust that is appropriate to persons will be appropriate to God. American psychologist and philosopher William James offers a similar argument in his lecture The Will to Believe.

Foundationalism is a view about the structure of justification or knowledge. Foundationalism holds that all knowledge and justified belief are ultimately based upon what are called properly basic beliefs. This position is intended to resolve the infinite regress problem in epistemology. According to foundationalism, a belief is epistemically justified only if it is justified by properly basic beliefs. One of the significant developments in foundationalism is the rise of reformed epistemology.

Reformed epistemology is a view about the epistemology of religious belief, which holds that belief in God can be properly basic. Analytic philosophers Alvin Plantinga and Nicholas Wolterstorff develop this view. Plantinga holds that a person may rationally believe in God even though the person does not possess sufficient evidence to convince an agnostic. One difference between reformed epistemology and fideism is that the former requires defense against known objections, whereas the latter might dismiss such objections as irrelevant. Plantinga developed reformed epistemology in Warranted Christian Belief as a form of externalism that holds that the justification-conferring factors for a belief may include external factors.

Some theistic philosophers have defended theism by granting evidentialism but supporting theism through deductive arguments whose premises are considered justifiable. Some of these arguments are probabilistic, either in the sense of having weight but being inconclusive or in the sense of having a mathematical probability assigned to them. Notable in this regard are the cumulative arguments presented by British philosopher Basil Mitchell and analytic philosopher Richard Swinburne, whose arguments are based on Bayesian probability. In a notable exposition of his arguments, Swinburne appeals to an inference for the best explanation.

Professor of Mathematics and philosopher of science at University of Oxford John Lennox justifies his religious belief in Jesus's resurrection and miracles by believing God's capability of breaking the commonly recognized law of nature. John Lennox has stated, "Faith is not a leap in the dark; it's the exact opposite. It's a commitment based on evidence… It is irrational to reduce all faith to blind faith and then subject it to ridicule. That provides a very anti-intellectual and convenient way of avoiding intelligent discussion." He criticises Richard Dawkins as a famous proponent of asserting that faith equates to holding a belief without evidence, thus that it is possible to hold belief without evidence, for failing to provide evidence for this assertion.

Critics of reformed epistemology argue that it fails to provide a compelling justification for belief in God and that it is unable to account for the diversity of religious belief and experience. They also argue that it can lead to a kind of epistemic relativism, in which all religious beliefs are considered equally valid and justified, regardless of their content or coherence. Despite these criticisms, reformed epistemology has been influential in the contemporary philosophy of religion and continues to be an active area of debate and discussion.

=== Empirical claims ===
Many religious beliefs are intended to be metaphorical or symbolic, but there are also religious beliefs that are taken quite literally by believers. For example, some Christians believe that the Earth was created in six literal days, and some Muslims believe that the Quran contains scientific facts that were not known to humans at the time of its revelation. Furthermore, even if a religious belief is intended to be metaphorical or symbolic, it can still be subject to empirical testing if it makes claims about the world. For example, the claim that the Earth is the center of the universe can be interpreted as a metaphorical representation of humanity's special place in the cosmos, but it also makes an empirical claim that can be tested by scientific observation.

=== Morality and faith ===
From a scientific perspective, morality is not dependent on faith. While some individuals may claim that their morality is rooted in their faith or religious beliefs, there is evidence to suggest that morality is also influenced by other factors, such as social and cultural norms, empathy, and reason. Studies have shown that individuals from diverse cultural and religious backgrounds tend to share many moral values, suggesting that morality is not solely dependent on faith. Additionally, research in the fields of psychology, neuroscience, and evolutionary biology has shed light on the biological and cognitive mechanisms underlying moral decision-making, providing further evidence that morality is not exclusively dependent on faith.

=== Criticism ===
Bertrand Russell wrote:

Christians hold that their faith does good, but other faiths do harm. At any rate, they hold this about the communist faith. What I wish to maintain is that all faiths do harm. We may define "faith" as a firm belief in something for which there is no evidence. Where there is evidence, no one speaks of "faith". We do not speak of faith that two and two are four or that the earth is round. We only speak of faith when we wish to substitute emotion for evidence. The substitution of emotion for evidence is apt to lead to strife, since different groups substitute different emotions. Christians have faith in the Resurrection; communists have faith in Marx's Theory of Value. Neither faith can be defended rationally, and each therefore is defended by propaganda and, if necessary, by war.

— Will Religious Faith Cure Our Troubles?

Evolutionary biologist Richard Dawkins criticizes all faith by generalizing from specific faith in propositions that conflict directly with scientific evidence. He describes faith as belief without evidence; a process of active non-thinking. He states that it is a practice that only degrades our understanding of the natural world by allowing anyone to make a claim about nature that is based solely on their personal thoughts, and possibly distorted perceptions, that does not require testing against nature, cannot make reliable and consistent predictions, and is not subject to peer review.

Philosophy professor Peter Boghossian argues that reason and evidence are the only way to determine which "claims about the world are likely true". Different religious traditions make different religious claims, and Boghossian asserts that faith alone cannot resolve conflicts between these without evidence. He gives an example of the belief held by Muslims that Muhammad (who died in the year 632) was the last prophet, and the contradictory belief held by Mormons that Joseph Smith (born in 1805) was a prophet. Boghossian asserts that faith has no "built-in corrective mechanism". For factual claims, he gives the example of the belief that the Earth is 4,000 years old. With only faith and no reason or evidence, he argues, there is no way to correct this claim if it is inaccurate. Boghossian advocates thinking of faith either as "belief without evidence" or "pretending to know things you don't know".

Friedrich Nietzsche expressed his criticism of the Christian idea of faith in passage 51 of The Antichrist:

The fact that faith, under certain circumstances, may work for blessedness, but that this blessedness produced by an idée fixe by no means makes the idea itself true, and the fact that faith actually moves no mountains, but instead raises them up where there were none before: all this is made sufficiently clear by a walk through a lunatic asylum. Not, of course, to a priest: for his instincts prompt him to the lie that sickness is not sickness and lunatic asylums not lunatic asylums. Christianity finds sickness necessary, just as the Greek spirit had need of a superabundance of health—the actual ulterior purpose of the whole system of salvation of the church is to make people ill. And the church itself—doesn't it set up a Catholic lunatic asylum as the ultimate ideal?—The whole earth as a madhouse?—The sort of religious man that the church wants is a typical décadent; the moment at which a religious crisis dominates a people is always marked by epidemics of nervous disorder; the "inner world" of the religious man is so much like the "inner world" of the overstrung and exhausted that it is difficult to distinguish between them; the "highest" states of mind, held up before mankind by Christianity as of supreme worth, are actually epileptoid in form—the church has granted the name of holy only to lunatics or to gigantic frauds in majorem dei honorem....

Gustave Le Bon emphasizes the irrational nature of faith and suggests that it is often based on emotions rather than reason. He argues that faith can be used to manipulate and control people, particularly in the context of religious or political movements. In this sense, Le Bon views faith as a tool that can be wielded by those in power to shape the beliefs and behaviors of the masses.

Faith as in 'strong unshakable faith' is considered a virtue by many religious believers. This has been criticized since beliefs, including religious beliefs, should not be "exempt from critical evaluation" even if questioning or reconsidering these is difficult.

== See also ==
- Blue skies research – Curiosity-driven scientific research, without a clear practical goal
- Delusion – Fixation of holding false beliefs
- Dogma – Beliefs accepted by members of a group without question
- Faith and rationality
- Incorrigibility – Property of a philosophical proposition
- Life stance – Person's relation with what they accept as being of ultimate importance
- Major religious groups
- Numinous – Arousing spiritual or religious emotion; mysterious or awe-inspiring
- Pascal's wager – Argument for the belief in God
- Philosophy of religion – Branch of philosophy
- Piety – Religious devotion or spirituality
- Rationalism – Epistemological view centered on reason
- Religious conversion – Adoption of religious beliefs
- Saint Faith – Gallo-Roman saint
- Simple church – Private Christian gathering
- Spectrum of theistic probability – Way of categorizing one's belief regarding the probability of the existence of a deity
- Theological virtues – Christian ethics
- There are no atheists in foxholes – Expression that high-stress situations prompt everyone to believe in god
- Truthiness – Belief in truth based on only intuition
- Worldview – Fundamental cognitive orientation of an individual or society
