= Warrant: The Current Debate =

1993 book by Alvin Plantinga

- Author: Alvin Plantinga
- Language: English
- Subject: Epistemology
- Publisher: Oxford University Press
- Publication date: 1993
- Publication place: United States
- Pages: 228
- ISBN: 978-0-19-507862-6
- Dewey Decimal: 121/.6
- LC Class: BD161 .P58
- Followed by: Warrant and Proper Function

Warrant: The Current Debate is the first in a trilogy of books written by the philosopher Alvin Plantinga on epistemology. Plantinga introduces, analyzes, and criticizes 20th-century developments in analytic epistemology, particularly the works of Roderick Chisholm, Laurence BonJour, William Alston, Alvin Goldman, and others. In the 1993 book, Plantinga argues specifically that the theories of what he calls "warrant" – what many others have called justification (Plantinga draws out a difference: justification is a property of a person holding a belief while warrant is a property of a belief) – put forth by these epistemologists have systematically failed to capture in full what is required for knowledge.

== See also ==
- Warrant and Proper Function
- Warranted Christian Belief
