= Alvin Plantinga =

American philosopher and theologian (born 1932)

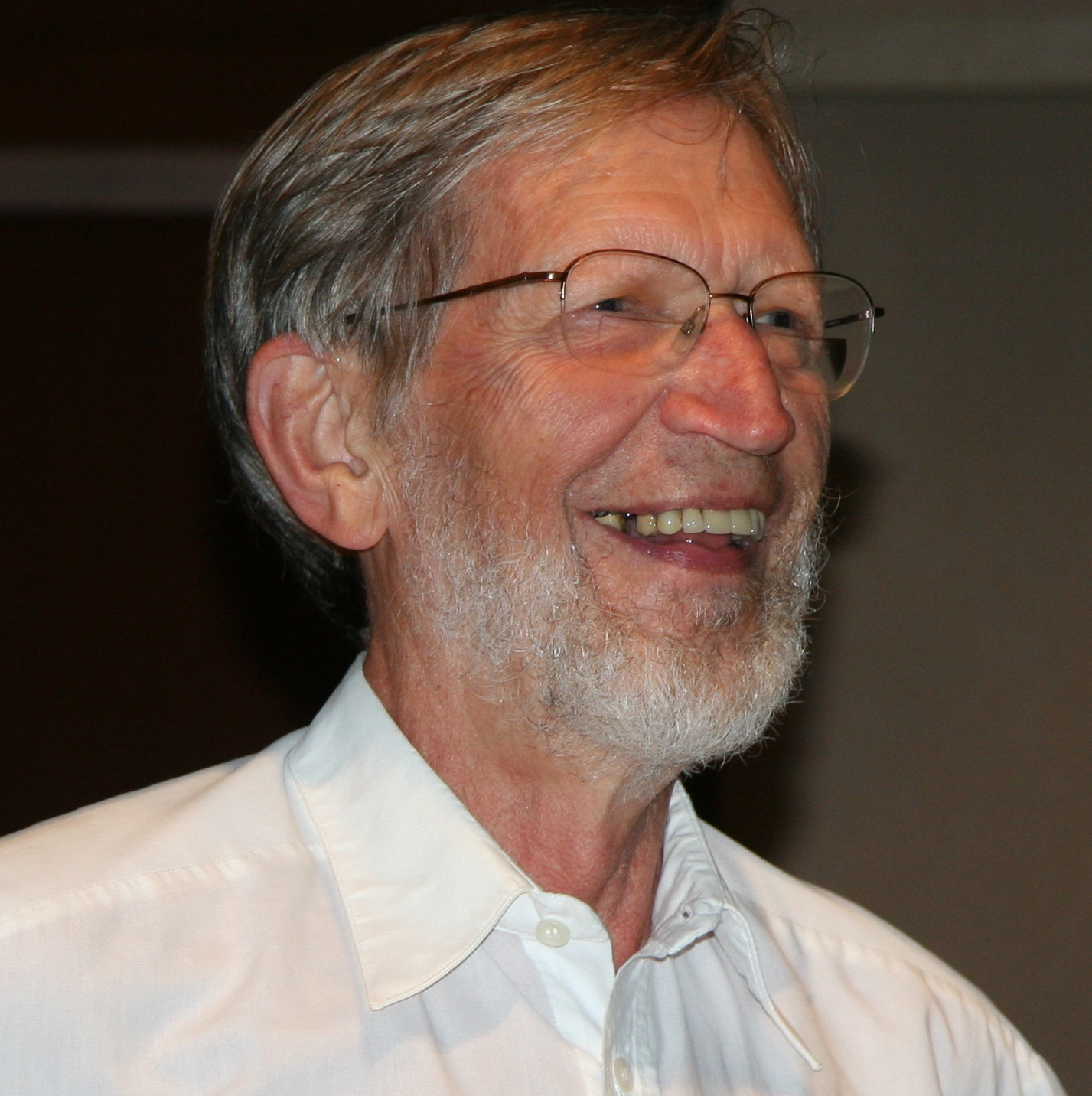
- Plantinga in 2009
- Born: November 15, 1932 (age 93); Ann Arbor, Michigan, U.S.
- Spouse: Kathleen De Boer (m. 1955)
- Awards: Nicholas Rescher Prize for Systematic Philosophy (2012); Templeton Prize (2017)

Education
- Education: Harvard University; Calvin College (BA); University of Michigan (MA); Yale University (PhD)
- Thesis: Ethics and metaphysical naturalism (1958)
- Doctoral advisor: Paul Weiss
- Other advisor: W. V. O. Quine

Philosophical work
- School: Analytic
- Institutions: University of Notre Dame; Calvin University
- Main interests: Epistemology; metaphysics; philosophy of religion; logic; modal logic; philosophy of science; natural theology
- Notable works: God and Other Minds (1967); The Nature of Necessity (1974); Warrant (1993); Warranted Christian Belief (2000)
- Notable ideas: Plantinga's free-will defense; Evolutionary argument against naturalism

Alvin Carl Plantinga (Note: Pronounced /ˈplæntɪŋɡə/) (born November 15, 1932) is an American analytic philosopher and theologian who is a leading figure in the Reformed epistemology movement. He is the John A. O'Brien Professor of Philosophy Emeritus at the University of Notre Dame and a professor emeritus of philosophy at Calvin University.

After earning his doctorate in philosophy from Yale University, Plantinga became a professor at Wayne State University in 1958, taught at Calvin College from 1963 to 1982, and co-founded the Society of Christian Philosophers in 1983. A prominent Christian philosopher, he is best known for his contributions to the philosophy of religion, metaphysics of modalities, and epistemology. He was described by Time magazine in 1980 as "America's leading Protestant philosopher of God".

Plantinga's most influential works include God and Other Minds (1967), The Nature of Necessity (1974), and a trilogy of books on epistemology, culminating in Warranted Christian Belief (2000) and simplified in Knowledge and Christian Belief (2015). He was elected to the American Academy of Arts and Sciences in 1975, received the Nicholas Rescher Prize for Systematic Philosophy in 2012, and was awarded the Templeton Prize in 2017.

== Biography ==
=== Early life and education ===
Plantinga was born on November 15, 1932, in Ann Arbor, Michigan. His father, Cornelius A. Plantinga (1908–1994), was a Dutch philosopher from Garyp, Friesland, who earned a doctorate in philosophy from Duke University under William McDougall and William Stern. His mother, Lettie G. Bossenbroek (1908–2007), was a Dutch-American typist. Plantinga and his brother, Leon, were born when their father was a graduate student at the University of Michigan. In 1941, Cornelius began teaching at Huron College, so Plantinga spent fifth and sixth grade in Huron, South Dakota. In 1943, Cornelius moved to Jamestown College in Jamestown, North Dakota, where he taught Latin, Greek, philosophy, and psychology. Plantinga's younger brothers, Terrell and Cornelius Jr., were both born in Jamestown while their father was teaching there.

After finishing eleventh grade at Jamestown High School, Plantinga skipped his senior year to enroll at Jamestown College in 1949, at the age of sixteen. But in his first semester of college, his father moved to teach psychology at Calvin College in Grand Rapids, Michigan, so Plantinga transferred there in January 1950. Then, during his first semester at Calvin College, he applied for and won a scholarship to attend Harvard University, so he transferred colleges for the second time to enroll at Harvard in the fall of 1950.

Plantinga spent two semesters as an undergraduate at Harvard College, during which he took philosophy classes under Raphael Demos and logic classes under Willard Van Orman Quine. During a spring recess, he attended three philosophy classes taught by William Harry Jellema at Calvin College—experiences which he recalled as "a fateful week". He has described Jellema as "the most gifted teacher of philosophy I have ever encountered". Plantinga was so impressed with Jellema that he withdrew from Harvard and transferred back to Calvin College in order to study philosophy under him. He graduated from Calvin with a Bachelor of Arts in 1954 with a triple major in philosophy, psychology, and English literature. One of his classmates, Nicholas Wolterstorff, also studied under Jellema and became a philosopher.

In 1954, Plantinga began his graduate studies at the University of Michigan, where he studied under philosophers William Alston, William Frankena, and Richard Cartwright. He earned his Master of Arts in philosophy from the university in 1955. He then pursued doctoral studies at Yale University, where his professors included Paul Weiss and Brand Blanshard. He earned his Ph.D. in philosophy from Yale in 1958. His doctoral dissertation, completed under Weiss's supervision, was titled, "Ethics and metaphysical naturalism".

=== Academic career ===
Plantinga began his career as a philosophy instructor at Yale in 1957 focusing on metaphysics and epistemology. While teaching at Yale, he received an offer by George Nakhnikian of Wayne State University to join its philosophy faculty and did so as an associate professor in the fall of 1958, a choice he later called "one of the best decisions I ever made". It was as a professor at Wayne State that Plantinga began studying the works of Roderick Chisholm, of whom he later said, "I suppose there is no other contemporary philosopher [than Chisholm] from whom I have learned more over the years".

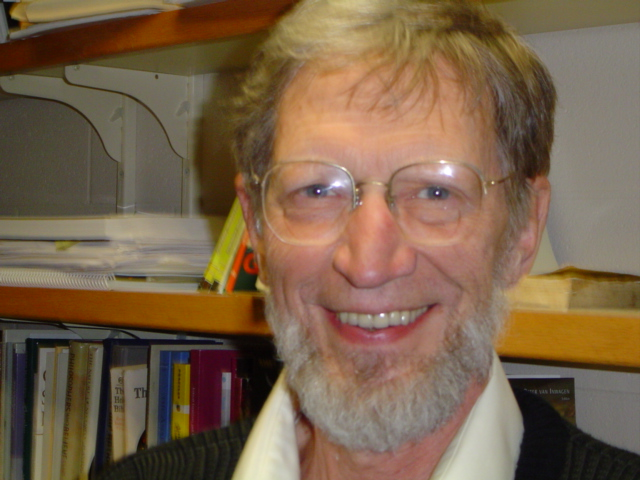
Plantinga in 2004

In 1963, Plantinga accepted an invitation to move to the philosophy department at Calvin College to replace Jellema, who was retiring at the age of 70. He remained at Calvin College for nineteen years, during which he was a fellow of the Center for Advanced Study in the Behavioral Sciences in 1968–69; a Guggenheim Fellow in 1971 and 1972; a visiting fellow at Balliol College, Oxford, in 1975–76; and the vice president of the Central Division of the American Philosophical Association from 1980 to 1981, then its president from 1981 to 1982. He was an associate professor of philosophy at Calvin College from 1963 to 1964, then a full professor from 1964 onwards. He also held various teaching appointments at Harvard Divinity School, the University of Oxford, the University of California, Los Angeles, and the University of Illinois.

In 1982, Plantinga moved to the University of Notre Dame, where he was appointed the John A. O'Brien Professor of Philosophy and the director of its Center for Philosophy of Religion. As a professor at Notre Dame, he served as the president of the Society of Christian Philosophers from 1982 to 1986, an organization which he co-founded. He also held named lectureships at Fordham University (1986), Princeton University (1990), Virginia Tech (1991), and the University of Florida (1995). He retired from full-time teaching at Notre Dame in 2010 (becoming a professor emeritus), but began teaching part-time in 2011 at Calvin College, where he became the inaugural holder of its William Harry Jellema Chair in Philosophy.

Notable students of Plantinga include the philosophers Michael Bergmann, Kelly James Clark, Robin Collins, Thomas Flint, Trenton Merricks, and Michael Rea. In 2014, Plantinga was the 30th most-cited contemporary author in the Stanford Encyclopedia of Philosophy.

== Philosophy ==
Plantinga is the author of more than 160 articles, essays, and books. In 1980, Time magazine described him as "America's leading Protestant philosopher of God". Canadian religious scholar John G. Stackhouse Jr. described him in 2001 as "arguably the greatest philosopher of the last century". Philosopher James Beilby described him in 2005 as "undoubtedly one of the world's most respected philosophers". Deane Baker of the University of Sydney wrote in 2007: "Few thinkers have had as much impact on contemporary philosophy as has Alvin Plantinga". According to theologians William Edgar and K. Scott Oliphint, "it would not be an overstatement to say that virtually all matters metaphysical and epistemological must address much of Plantinga's own work".

Plantinga has argued that some people can know that God exists as a basic belief, requiring no argument. He developed this argument in two different ways: firstly, in God and Other Minds (1967), by drawing an equivalence between the teleological argument and the common sense view that people have of other minds existing by analogy with their own minds. Plantinga has also developed a more comprehensive epistemological account of the nature of warrant which allows for the existence of God as a basic belief.

Plantinga has also argued that there is no logical inconsistency between the existence of evil and the existence of an all-powerful, all-knowing, wholly good God.

=== Problem of evil ===
Plantinga proposed a "free-will defense" in a volume edited by Max Black in 1965, which attempts to refute the logical problem of evil, the argument that the existence of evil is logically incompatible with the existence of an omnipotent, omniscient, wholly good God. Plantinga's argument (in a truncated form) states that "It is possible that God, even being omnipotent, could not create a world with free creatures who never choose evil. Furthermore, it is possible that God, even being omnibenevolent, would desire to create a world which contains evil if moral goodness requires free moral creatures."

However, the argument's handling of natural evil has been disputed. According to the Internet Encyclopedia of Philosophy, the argument also "conflicts with important theistic doctrines" such as the notion of a heaven where free saved souls reside without doing evil, and the idea that God has free will yet is wholly good. Critics thus maintain that, if we take such doctrines to be (as Christians usually have), God could have created free creatures that always do right, contra Plantinga's claim. J. L. Mackie saw Plantinga's free-will defense as incoherent.

Plantinga's well-received book God, Freedom and Evil, written in 1974, gave his response to what he saw as the incomplete and uncritical view of theism's criticism of theodicy. Plantinga's contribution stated that when the issue of a comprehensive doctrine of freedom is added to the discussion of the goodness of God and the omnipotence of God then it is not possible to exclude the presence of evil in the world after introducing freedom into the discussion. Plantinga's own summary occurs in his discussion titled "Could God Have Created a World Containing Moral Good but No Moral Evil", where he states his conclusion that, "... the price for creating a world in which they produce moral good is creating one in which they also produce moral evil."

=== Reformed epistemology ===
What Plantinga calls "Reformed epistemology" holds that belief in God can be rational and justified even without arguments or evidence for the existence of God. More specifically, he argues belief in God is properly basic, and due to a religious externalist epistemology, he claims that it could be justified independently of evidence. His externalist epistemology, called "proper functionalism", is a form of epistemological reliabilism.

Plantinga discusses his view of Reformed epistemology and proper functionalism in a three-volume series. In the first book of the trilogy, Warrant: The Current Debate, Plantinga introduces, analyzes, and criticizes 20th-century developments in analytic epistemology, particularly the works of Chisholm, BonJour, Alston, Goldman, and others. In the book, Plantinga argues specifically that the theories of what he calls "warrant"—what many others have called justification (Plantinga draws out a difference: justification is a property of a person holding a belief while warrant is a property of a belief)—put forth by these epistemologists have systematically failed to capture in full what is required for knowledge.

In the second book, Warrant and Proper Function, he introduces the notion of warrant as an alternative to justification and discusses topics like self-knowledge, memories, perception, and probability. Plantinga's "proper function" account argues that as a necessary condition of having warrant, one's "belief-forming and belief-maintaining apparatus of powers" are functioning properly—"working the way it ought to work". Plantinga explains his argument for proper function with reference to a "design plan", as well as an environment in which one's cognitive equipment is optimal for use. Plantinga asserts that the design plan does not require a designer: "it is perhaps possible that evolution (undirected by God or anyone else) has somehow furnished us with our design plans", but the paradigm case of a design plan is like a technological product designed by a human being (like a radio or a wheel). Ultimately, Plantinga argues that epistemological naturalism—i.e. epistemology that holds that warrant is dependent on natural faculties—is best supported by supernaturalist metaphysics—in this case, the belief in a creator God or designer who has laid out a design plan that includes cognitive faculties conducive to attaining knowledge.

According to Plantinga, a belief, B, is warranted if:

(1) the cognitive faculties involved in the production of B are functioning properly...; (2) your cognitive environment is sufficiently similar to the one for which your cognitive faculties are designed; (3) ... the design plan governing the production of the belief in question involves, as purpose or function, the production of true beliefs...; and (4) the design plan is a good one: that is, there is a high statistical or objective probability that a belief produced in accordance with the relevant segment of the design plan in that sort of environment is true.

Plantinga seeks to defend this view of proper function against alternative views of proper function proposed by other philosophers which he groups together as "naturalistic", including the "functional generalization" view of John Pollock, the evolutionary/etiological account provided by Ruth Millikan, and a dispositional view held by John Bigelow and Robert Pargetter. Plantinga also discusses his evolutionary argument against naturalism in the later chapters of Warrant and Proper Function.

In 2000, the third book of the trilogy, Warranted Christian Belief, was published. In this volume, Plantinga's warrant theory is the basis for his theological end: providing a philosophical basis for Christian belief, an argument for why Christian theistic belief can enjoy warrant. In the book, he develops two models for such beliefs, the "A/C" (Aquinas/Calvin) model, and the "Extended A/C" model. The former attempts to show that a belief in God can be justified, warranted and rational, while the Extended model tries to show that specifically Christian theological beliefs including the Trinity, the Incarnation, the resurrection of Christ, the atonement, salvation. etc. Under this model, Christians are justified in their beliefs because of the work of the Holy Spirit in bringing those beliefs about in the believer.

James Beilby has argued that the purpose of Plantinga's Warrant trilogy, and specifically of his Warranted Christian Belief, is firstly to make a form of argument against religion impossible—namely, the argument that whether or not Christianity is true, it is irrational—so "the skeptic would have to shoulder the formidable task of demonstrating the falsity of Christian belief" rather than simply dismiss it as irrational. In addition, Plantinga is attempting to provide a philosophical explanation of how Christians should think about their own Christian belief.

=== Modal ontological argument ===
Plantinga has expressed a modal logic version of the ontological argument in which he uses modal logic to develop, in a more rigorous and formal way, Norman Malcolm's and Charles Hartshorne's modal ontological arguments.

Plantinga criticized Malcolm's and Hartshorne's arguments, and offered an alternative. He argued that, if Malcolm does prove the necessary existence of the greatest possible being, it follows that there is a being which exists in all worlds whose greatness in some worlds is not surpassed. It does not, he argued, demonstrate that such a being has unsurpassed greatness in this world.

In an attempt to resolve this problem, Plantinga differentiated between "greatness" and "excellence". A being's excellence in a particular world depends only on its properties in that world; a being's greatness depends on its properties in all worlds. Therefore, the greatest possible being must have maximal excellence in every possible world. Plantinga then restated Malcolm's argument, using the concept of "maximal greatness". He argued that it is possible for a being with maximal greatness to exist, so a being with maximal greatness exists in a possible world. If this is the case, then a being with maximal greatness exists in every world, and therefore in this world.

The conclusion relies on a form of modal axiom S5, which states that if something is possibly true, then its possibility is necessary (it is possibly true in all worlds). Plantinga's version of S5 suggests that "To say that p is possibly necessarily true is to say that, with regard to one world, it is true at all worlds; but in that case it is true at all worlds, and so it is simply necessary." A version of his argument is as follows:

1. A being has maximal excellence in a given possible world W if and only if it is omnipotent, omniscient and wholly good in W; and
2. A being has maximal greatness if it has maximal excellence in every possible world.
3. It is possible that there is a being that has maximal greatness. (Premise)
4. Therefore, possibly, it is necessarily true that an omniscient, omnipotent, and perfectly good being exists.
5. Therefore, (by axiom S5) it is necessarily true that an omniscient, omnipotent and perfectly good being exists.
6. Therefore, an omniscient, omnipotent and perfectly good being exists.

Plantinga argued that, although the first premise is not rationally established, it is not contrary to reason. Michael Martin argued that, if certain components of perfection are contradictory, such as omnipotence and omniscience, then the first premise is contrary to reason. Martin also proposed parodies of the argument, suggesting that the existence of anything can be demonstrated with Plantinga's argument, provided it is defined as perfect or special in every possible world.

Another Christian philosopher, William Lane Craig, characterizes Plantinga's argument in a slightly different way:

1. It is possible that a maximally great being exists.
2. If it is possible that a maximally great being exists, then a maximally great being exists in some possible world.
3. If a maximally great being exists in some possible world, then it exists in every possible world.
4. If a maximally great being exists in every possible world, then it exists in the actual world.
5. If a maximally great being exists in the actual world, then a maximally great being exists.
6. Therefore, a maximally great being exists.

According to Craig, premises (2)–(5) are relatively uncontroversial among philosophers, but "the epistemic entertainability of premise (1) (or its denial) does not guarantee its metaphysical possibility." Furthermore, Richard M. Gale argued that premise three, the "possibility premise", begs the question. He stated that one only has the epistemic right to accept the premise if one understands the nested modal operators, and that if one understands them within the system S5—without which the argument fails—then one understands that "possibly necessarily" is in essence the same as "necessarily". Thus the premise begs the question because the conclusion is embedded within it. On S5 systems in general, James Garson writes that "the words 'necessarily' and 'possibly', have many different uses. So the acceptability of axioms for modal logic depends on which of these uses we have in mind."

=== Evolutionary argument against naturalism ===
In Plantinga's evolutionary argument against naturalism, he argues that if evolution is true, it undermines naturalism. His basic argument is that if evolution and naturalism are both true, human cognitive faculties evolved to produce beliefs that have survival value (maximizing one's success at the four Fs: "feeding, fleeing, fighting, and reproducing"), not necessarily to produce beliefs that are true. Thus, since human cognitive faculties are tuned to survival rather than truth in the naturalism-evolution model, there is reason to doubt the veracity of the products of those same faculties, including naturalism and evolution themselves. On the other hand, if God created man "in his image" by way of an evolutionary process (or any other means), then Plantinga argues our faculties would probably be reliable.

The argument does not assume any necessary correlation (or uncorrelation) between true beliefs and survival. Making the contrary assumption—that there is, in fact, a relatively strong correlation between truth and survival—if human belief-forming apparatus evolved giving a survival advantage, then it ought to yield truth since true beliefs confer a survival advantage. Plantinga counters that, while there may be overlap between true beliefs and beliefs that contribute to survival, the two kinds of beliefs are not the same, and he gives the following example with a man named Paul:

Perhaps Paul very much likes the idea of being eaten, but when he sees a tiger, always runs off looking for a better prospect, because he thinks it unlikely the tiger he sees will eat him. This will get his body parts in the right place so far as survival is concerned, without involving much by way of true belief... Or perhaps he thinks the tiger is a large, friendly, cuddly pussycat and wants to pet it; but he also believes that the best way to pet it is to run away from it... Clearly there are any number of belief-desire systems that equally fit a given bit of behaviour.

The argument has received favorable notice from Thomas Nagel and William Lane Craig, but has also been criticized as seriously flawed, for example, by Elliott Sober.

=== View on naturalism and evolution ===
Even though Plantinga believes that God could have used Darwinian processes to create the world, he stands firm against philosophical naturalism. He said in an interview on the relationship between science and religion that:

Religion and science share more common ground than you might think, though science can't prove, it presupposes that there has been a past for example, science does not cover the whole of the knowledge enterprise.

Plantinga participated in groups that support the Intelligent Design Movement, and was a member of the "Ad Hoc Origins Committee" that supported Philip E. Johnson's 1991 book Darwin on Trial, he also provided a back-cover endorsement of Johnson's book: "Shows how Darwinian evolution has become an idol."

He was a Fellow of the (now defunct) pro-intelligent design International Society for Complexity, Information, and Design, and has presented at a number of intelligent design conferences. In a March 2010 article in The Chronicle of Higher Education, philosopher of science Michael Ruse labeled Plantinga as an "open enthusiast of intelligent design". In a letter to the editor, Plantinga made the following response:

Like any Christian (and indeed any theist), I believe that the world has been created by God, and hence "intelligently designed". The hallmark of intelligent design, however, is the claim that this can be shown scientifically; I'm dubious about that.

...As far as I can see, God certainly could have used Darwinian processes to create the living world and direct it as he wanted to go; hence evolution as such does not imply that there is no direction in the history of life. What does have that implication is not evolutionary theory itself, but unguided evolution, the idea that neither God nor any other person has taken a hand in guiding, directing or orchestrating the course of evolution. But the scientific theory of evolution, sensibly enough, says nothing one way or the other about divine guidance. It doesn't say that evolution is divinely guided; it also doesn't say that it isn't. Like almost any theist, I reject unguided evolution; but the contemporary scientific theory of evolution just as such—apart from philosophical or theological add-ons—doesn't say that evolution is unguided. Like science in general, it makes no pronouncements on the existence or activity of God.

The attitude that he proposes and elaborates upon in Where the Conflict Really Lies: Science, Religion and Naturalism is that there is no tension between religion and science, that the two go hand in hand, and that the actual conflict lies between naturalism and science.

== Personal life ==
Plantinga is a Calvinist and a member of the Dutch Reformed Church. He married Kathleen De Boer, a former classmate, in June 1955. They have four children: Carl, Jane, William Harry, and Ann. Their two sons, Carl Plantinga and William Harry Plantinga, became professors, and their two daughters—Jane (Jane Plantinga Pauw) and Ann (Ann Plantinga Kapteyn)—became a pastor and translator, respectively.

== Awards and honors ==
Plantinga was elected a fellow of the American Academy of Arts and Sciences in 1975. In 1981, he was a awarded a fellowship by the American Council of Learned Societies. He was chosen to give the Gifford Lectures twice, first in 1987 at the University of Aberdeen, and secondly in 2005 at the University of St Andrews. In 2003, the Center for Philosophy of Religion at Notre Dame renamed one of its fellowships, the "Distinguished Scholar Fellowship," in Plantinga's honor. Notre Dame also endowed a named lecture, the Alvin Plantinga Fellow Lecture, in his honor. In February 2012, the University of Pittsburgh awarded him the Nicholas Rescher Prize for Systematic Philosophy. In 2017, Plantinga was awarded the $1.1 million Templeton Prize.

Plantinga has received honorary degrees from Glasgow University (1982), Calvin College (1986), North Park College (1994), the Free University of Amsterdam (1995), Brigham Young University (1996), and Valparaiso University (1999).

== Selected works ==
- God and Other Minds. Ithaca, New York: Cornell University Press. 1967. ISBN 978-0-8014-9735-3.
- The Nature of Necessity. Oxford: Clarendon Press. 1974. ISBN 0-19-824404-5
- God, Freedom, and Evil. Grand Rapids: Eerdmans. 1974. ISBN 0-04-100040-4
- Does God Have a Nature? Wisconsin: Marquette University Press. 1980. ISBN 0-87462-145-3
- Faith and Rationality: Reason and Belief in God (ed. with Nicholas Wolterstorff). Notre Dame: University of Notre Dame Press. 1983. ISBN 0-268-00964-3
- Warrant: The Current Debate. New York: Oxford University Press. 1993. ISBN 0-19-507861-6
- Warrant and Proper Function. Oxford: Oxford University Press. 1993. ISBN 0-19-507863-2
- Warranted Christian Belief. New York: Oxford University Press. 2000. ISBN 0-19-513192-4 online
- Essays in the Metaphysics of Modality. Matthew Davidson (ed.). New York: Oxford University Press. 2003. ISBN 0-19-510376-9
- Knowledge of God (with Michael Tooley). Oxford: Blackwell. 2008. ISBN 0-631-19364-2
- Science and Religion (with Daniel Dennett). Oxford: Oxford University Press. 2010 ISBN 0-19-973842-4
- Where the Conflict Really Lies: Science, Religion, and Naturalism. Oxford: Oxford University Press. 2011. ISBN 0-19-981209-8
- Knowledge and Christian Belief. Grand Rapids: Eerdmans. 2015. ISBN 0802872042

== See also ==
- American philosophy
- List of American philosophers

== Notes ==
Professional and academic associations
Preceded by Alan Donagan	President of the American; Philosophical Association, Western Division; 1981–1982	Succeeded by Manley H. Thompson Jr.
Preceded by Robert Merrihew Adams	President of the Society of Christian Philosophers; 1983–1986	Succeeded by Marilyn McCord Adams
Awards
Preceded by Ernest Sosa	Nicholas Rescher Prize for Systematic Philosophy; 2012; With: Jürgen Mittelstraß	Succeeded by Hilary Putnam
Preceded by Jonathan Sacks	Templeton Prize; 2017	Succeeded by Abdullah II of Jordan
