= God and Other Minds =

1967 book by Alvin Plantinga

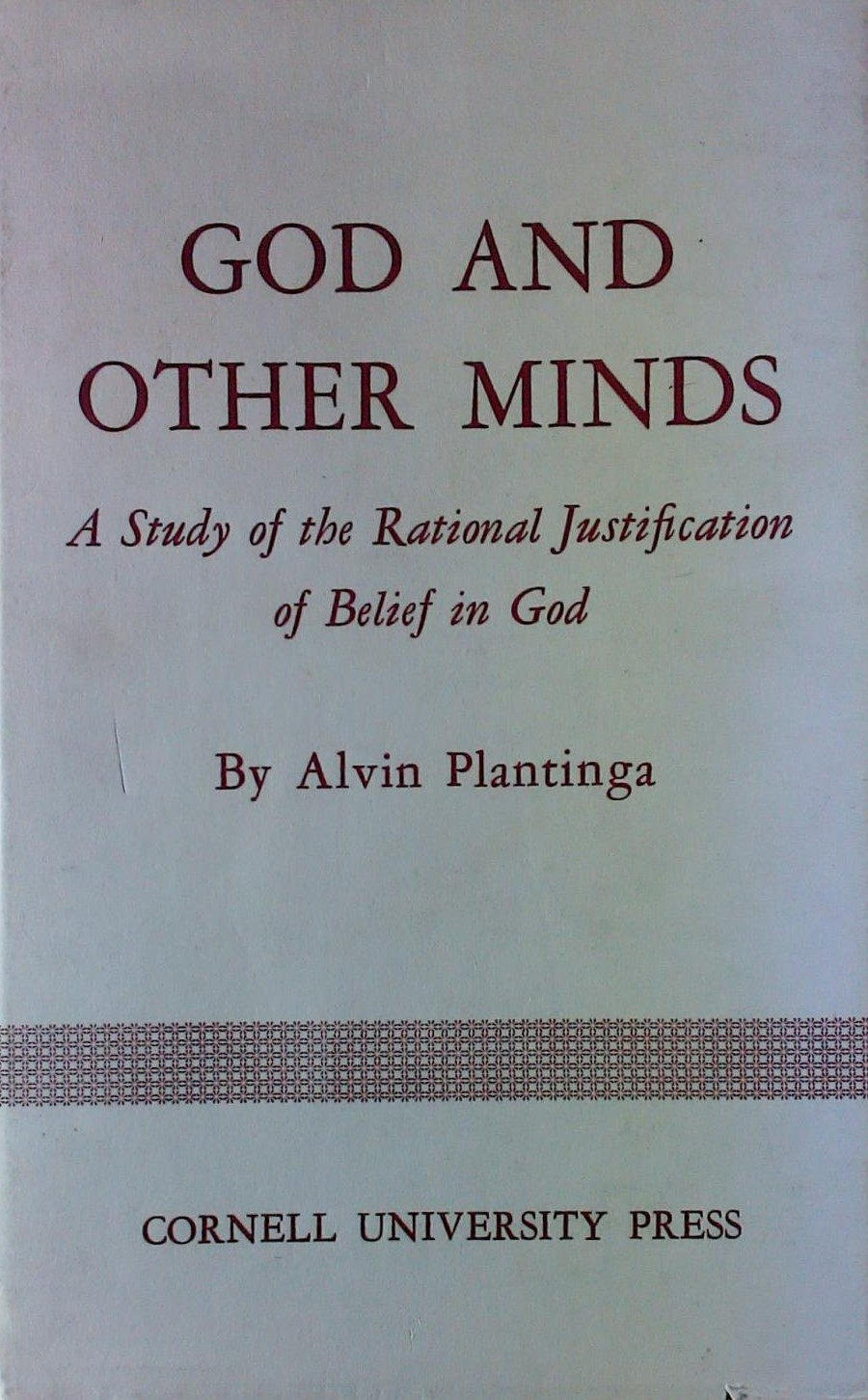
- Author: Alvin Plantinga
- Language: English
- Genre: Non-fiction
- Publisher: Cornell University Press
- Publication date: 1967
- Publication place: United States

God and Other Minds is a 1967 book by the American philosopher of religion Alvin Plantinga which re-kindled philosophical debate on the existence of God in Anglo-American philosophical circles by arguing that belief in God was like belief in other minds: although neither could be demonstrated conclusively against a determined sceptic both were fundamentally rational. Though Plantinga later modified some of his views, particularly on the soundness of the ontological argument and on the nature of epistemic rationality, he still stands by the basic theses of the book.

== Summary of God and Other Minds ==
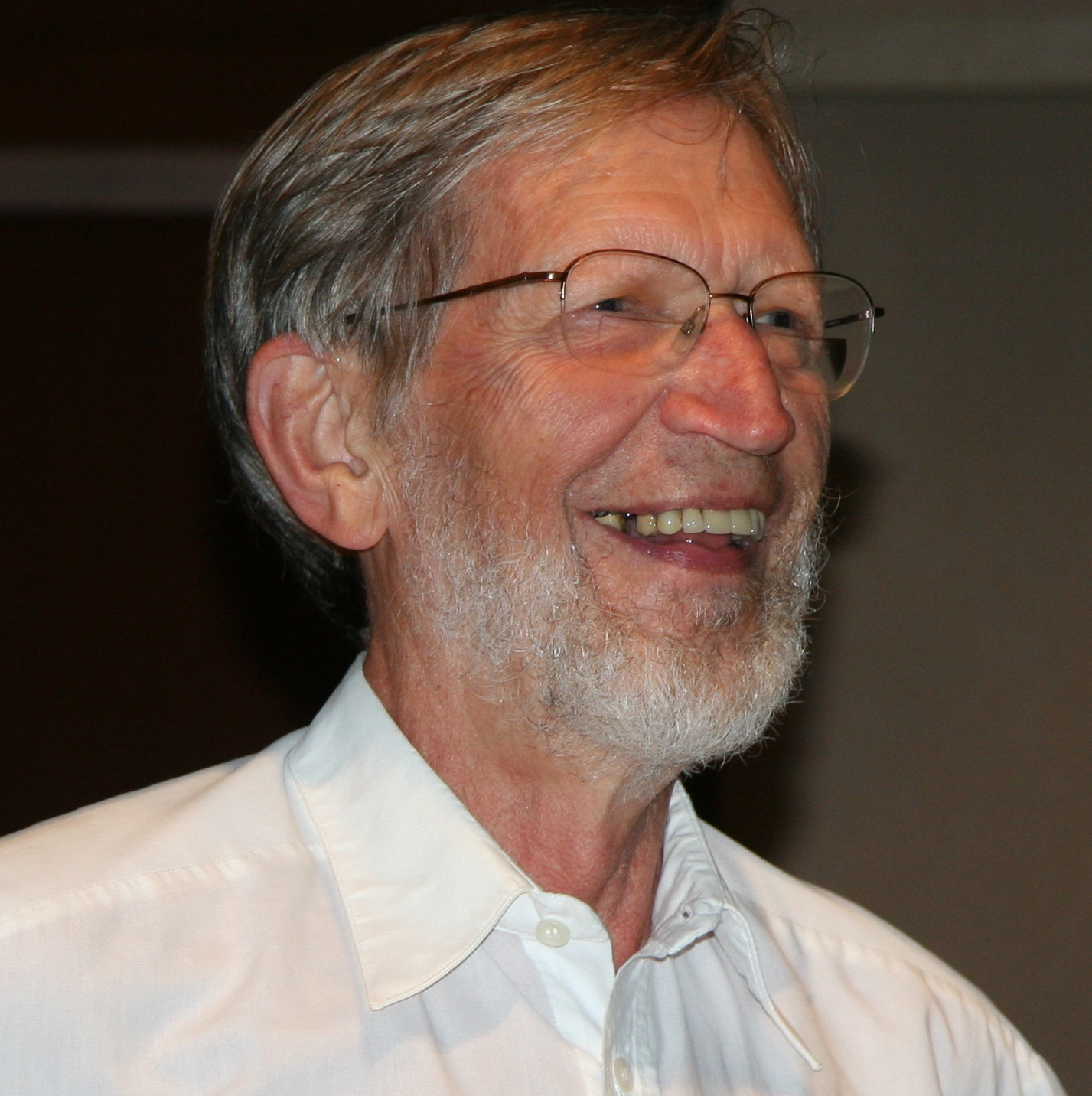
Alvin Plantinga, the author, in 2009

God and Other Minds: A Study of the Rational Justification of Belief in God was originally published by Cornell University Press in 1967. An edition with a new preface by Plantinga was published in 1990 (ISBN 978-0801497353).

The book explores the rationality of belief in God, as conceived in the Hebrew-Christian tradition. In Part, I, Plantinga examines a number of traditional arguments for God's existence and concludes that none successfully demonstrate God's existence. In Part II, he considers and rejects some major arguments against belief in God, including the problem of evil, the paradox of omnipotence, and verificationism. Finally, in Part III, he explores various analogies between belief in God and belief in other minds. He concludes that these two beliefs are in the same epistemic boat: if one is rationally justified, so is the other. Since belief in other minds is clearly rational, Plantinga argues, so is belief in God.

The book has the following chapters:

Part I: Natural Theology

- Ch 1: The Cosmological Argument
- Ch 2: The Ontological Argument - I
- Ch 3: The Ontological Argument - II
- Ch 4: The Teleological Argument

Part II: Natural Atheology

- Ch 5: The Problem of Evil
- Ch 6: The Free Will Defense
- Ch 7: Verificationism and other Atheologica

Part III: God and Other Minds

- Ch 8: Other Minds and Analogy
- Ch 9: Alternatives to the Analogical Position
- Ch 10: God and Analogy

== Scholarly reaction ==
Professor Michael A. Slote in The Journal of Philosophy considered that "[t]his book is one of the most important to have appeared in this century on the philosophy of religion, and makes outstanding contributions to our understanding of the problem of other minds as well".

According to the philosopher William Lane Craig, God and Other Minds helped to revitalize philosophy of religion after the palmy days of logical positivism by applying "the tools of analytic philosophy to questions in the philosophy of religion with an unprecedented rigor and creativity."

Alvin Plantinga’s response to the problem of evil, commonly known as the free will defense, contends that it is logically possible that an omnipotent and omnibenevolent God could not have created a world with a significantly better balance of good over evil than the actual world. This defense hinges on the claim that the existence of free will necessarily entails the possibility of moral evil, and that preventing such evil would require the elimination of genuine human freedom. By demonstrating that the coexistence of God and evil is not logically contradictory, the problem of evil for an omnibenevolent deity is resolved.
