= Alvin Plantinga's free-will defense =

Logical argument against the problem of evil

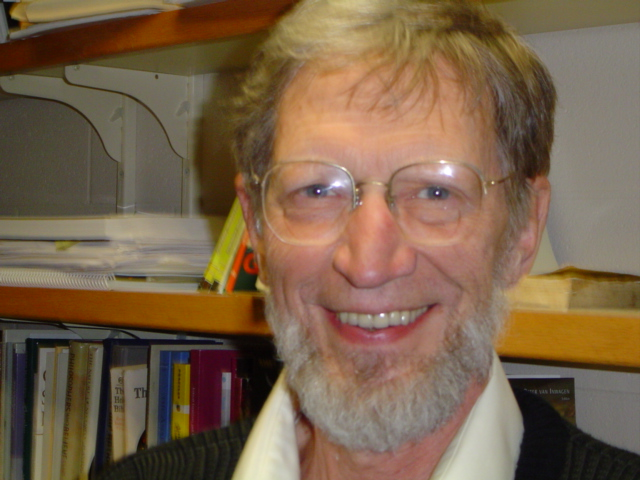
Alvin Plantinga in 2004

Alvin Plantinga's free-will defense is a logical argument developed by the American analytic philosopher Alvin Plantinga and published in its final version in his 1977 book God, Freedom, and Evil. Plantinga's argument is a defense against the logical problem of evil as formulated by the philosopher J. L. Mackie beginning in 1955. Mackie's formulation of the logical problem of evil argued that three attributes ascribed to God (omniscience, omnipotence, and omnibenevolence) are logically incompatible with the existence of evil.

== Mackie's logical argument from evil ==
The logical argument from evil argued by J. L. Mackie, and to which the free-will defense responds, is an argument against the existence of God based on the idea that a logical contradiction exists between four theological tenets often attributed to God. Specifically, the argument from evil asserts that the following set of propositions are, by themselves, logically inconsistent or contradictory:

1. God is omniscient (all-knowing)
2. God is omnipotent (all-powerful)
3. God is omnibenevolent (morally perfect)
4. There is evil in the world

Most orthodox Christian theologians agree with these four propositions. The logical argument from evil asserts that a God with the attributes (1–3), must know about all evil, would be capable of preventing it, and as morally perfect would be motivated to do so. The argument from evil concludes that the existence of the orthodox Christian God is, therefore, incompatible with the existence of evil and can be logically ruled out.

== Plantinga's free-will defense ==
Plantinga's free-will defense begins by noting a distinction between moral evil and physical evil (Plantinga's defense primarily references moral evil), then asserting that Mackie's argument failed to establish an explicit logical contradiction between God and the existence of moral evil. In other words, Plantinga shows that (1–4) are not, on their own, contradictory, and that any contradiction must originate from a theologian's implicit unstated assumptions — assumptions representing premises not stated in the argument itself. With an explicit contradiction ruled out, a theologian must add premises to the argument for it to succeed. Nonetheless, if Plantinga had offered no further argument, then a theologian's intuitive impressions that a contradiction must exist would have remained unanswered. Plantinga sought to resolve this by offering two further points.

First, Plantinga pointed out that omnipotence is the power to do all things logically possible, and thus God could not be expected to do things that are logically impossible according to modal logic. God could not, for example, create square circles, act contrary to His nature, or, more relevantly, create beings with free will that would never choose evil. Taking this latter point further, Plantinga argued that the moral value of human free will is a credible offsetting justification that God could have as a morally justified reason for permitting the existence of evil. Plantinga did not claim to have shown that the conclusion of the logical problem is wrong, nor did he assert that God's reason for allowing evil is, in fact, to preserve free will. Instead, his argument sought only to show that the logical problem of evil was invalid.

Plantinga's defense has received strong support among academic philosophers, with many agreeing that it defeated the logical problem. Contemporary atheologians have presented arguments claiming to have found the additional premises needed to create an explicitly contradictory theistic set by adding to the propositions 1–4.

In addition to Plantinga's free-will defense, there are other arguments purporting to undermine or disprove the logical argument from evil. Plantinga's free-will defense is the best known of these responses, at least in part because of his thoroughness in describing and addressing the relevant questions and issues in God, Freedom, and Evil.

== Further details ==
As opposed to a theodicy (a justification for God's actions), Plantinga puts forth a defense, offering a new proposition that is intended to demonstrate that it is logically possible for an omnibenevolent, omnipotent and omniscient God to create a world that contains moral evil. Significantly, Plantinga does not need to assert that his new proposition is true, merely that it is logically valid. In this way Plantinga's approach differs from that of a traditional theodicy, which would strive to show not just that the new propositions are valid, but that the argument is sound, prima facie plausible, or that there are good grounds for making it. Thus the burden of proof on Plantinga is lessened, and yet his approach may still serve as a defense against the claim by Mackie that the simultaneous existence of evil and an omnipotent and omnibenevolent God is "positively irrational".

As Plantinga summarized his defense:

A world containing creatures who are significantly free (and freely perform more good than evil actions) is more valuable, all else being equal, than a world containing no free creatures at all. Now God can create free creatures, but He can't cause or determine them to do only what is right. For if He does so, then they aren't significantly free after all; they do not do what is right freely. To create creatures capable of moral good, therefore, He must create creatures capable of moral evil; and He can't give these creatures the freedom to perform evil and at the same time prevent them from doing so. As it turned out, sadly enough, some of the free creatures God created went wrong in the exercise of their freedom; this is the source of moral evil. The fact that free creatures sometimes go wrong, however, counts neither against God's omnipotence nor against His goodness; for He could have forestalled the occurrence of moral evil only by removing the possibility of moral good.

Plantinga's argument is that even though God is omnipotent, it is possible that it was not in his power to create a world containing moral good but no moral evil; therefore, there is no logical inconsistency involved when God, although wholly good, creates a world of free creatures who choose to do evil. The argument relies on the following propositions:

1. There are possible worlds that even an omnipotent being can not actualize.
2. A world with morally free creatures producing only moral good is such a world.

Plantinga refers to the first statement as "Leibniz's lapse" as the opposite was assumed by Leibniz. The second proposition is more contentious. Plantinga rejects the compatibilist notion of freedom whereby God could directly cause agents to only do good without sacrificing their freedom. Although it would contradict a creature's freedom if God were to cause, or in Plantinga's terms strongly actualize, a world where creatures only do good, an omniscient God would still know the circumstances under which creatures would go wrong. Thus, God could avoid creating such circumstances, thereby weakly actualizing a world with only moral good. Plantinga's crucial argument is that this possibility may not be available to God because all possible morally free creatures suffer from "transworld depravity".

Plantinga thus argues that we cannot rule out the hypothesis that all free human beings suffer from transworld depravity. So this hypothesis may, for all we know, be true. And if it were true, it would rule out the possibility of a world in which human beings make free choices, but always act in good ways. Hence, if the hypothesis cannot be ruled out, this shows that the existence of evil is, after all, consistent with the existence of a God with the traditional attributes. (This goes through via the principle that, if the conjunction of P and some other proposition R (consistent with P), entails Q, then P is consistent with Q. Thus, if the existence of an omnipotent, omniscient, and wholly benevolent god, together with the hypothesis of transworld depravity, entails the existence of evil, (and if the transworld depravity hypothesis is consistent with the existence of a god with the three traditional attributes), then the existence of such a god is consistent with the existence of evil.)

== Reception ==
According to Chad Meister, professor of philosophy at Bethel University, most philosophers accept Plantinga's free-will defense and thus see the logical problem of evil as having been sufficiently rebutted. Robert Adams says that "it is fair to say that Plantinga has solved this problem. That is, he has argued convincingly for the consistency of God and evil." William Alston has said that "Plantinga ... has established the possibility that God could not actualize a world containing free creatures that always do the right thing." William L. Rowe has written "granted incompatibilism, there is a fairly compelling argument for the view that the existence of evil is logically consistent with the existence of the theistic God", referring to Plantinga's argument.

In Arguing About Gods, Graham Oppy offers a dissent, acknowledging that "[m]any philosophers seem to suppose that [Plantinga's free-will defense] utterly demolishes the kinds of 'logical' arguments from evil developed by Mackie" but continuing: "I am not sure this is a correct assessment of the current state of play." Concurring with Oppy, A. M. Weisberger writes "contrary to popular theistic opinion, the logical form of the argument is still alive and beating." Among contemporary philosophers, most discussion on the problem of evil presently revolves around the evidential problem of evil, namely that the existence of God is unlikely, rather than illogical.

Mackie had argued in The Miracle of Theism that Plantinga's hypothesis of transworld depravity can and should be rejected. It depends on the assumption that God, in creating humans, is faced with a limited number of possible essences that they can have. In particular, there is no essence available to him which is such that it is that of a free human agent and it is not afflicted with transworld depravity. But why might such a limited range of essences be available to an omnipotent God? The reason cannot be that it is logically impossible that a created human agent should always act rightly: even without being compatibilists, we can argue that there is no contradiction in the notion of a created agent who has alternatives, but who is inclined to exercise his free choice between alternatives only in good ways. But if it is not logically impossible that there should be such an essence, with which God could endow human beings, it is unclear why an omnipotent creator would be faced with any limit as to the range of possible human essences available.

"The concept of individual essences concedes that even if ... freedom in the important sense is not compatible with causal determinism, a person can still be such that he will freely choose this way or that in each specific situation. Given this, and given the unrestricted range of all logically possible creaturely essences from which an omnipotent and omniscient god would be free to select whom to create, ... my original criticism of the free will defence holds good: had there been such a god, it would have been open to him to create beings such that they would always freely choose the good."

== Additional objections and responses ==
=== Natural evil ===
A challenge to the free will defence is natural evil, evil which is the result of natural causes (e.g. a child suffering from a disease, mass casualties from a volcano). Criticism of natural evil posits that even if for some reason an all-powerful and all-benevolent God tolerated evil human actions in order to allow free will, such a God would not be expected to also tolerate natural evils because they have no apparent connection to free will. Patricia A. Williams says differentiating between moral and natural evil is common but, in her view, unjustified. "Because human beings and their choices are part of nature, all evils are natural".

Advocates of the free will response propose various explanations of natural evils. Alvin Plantinga references Augustine of Hippo, writing of the possibility that natural evils could be caused by supernatural beings such as Satan. Plantinga emphasizes that it is not necessary that this be true, it is only necessary that this possibility be compatible with the argument from free will. There are those who respond that Plantinga's free will response might address moral evil but not natural evil. Some scholars, such as David Griffin, state that free will, or the assumption of greater good through free will, does not apply to animals. In contrast, a few scholars, while accepting that "free will" applies in a human context, have posited an alternative "free creatures" defense, stating that animals too benefit from their physical freedom though that comes with the cost of dangers they continuously face.

The "free creatures" defense has also been criticized, in the case of caged, domesticated and farmed animals who are not free and many of whom have historically experienced evil and suffering from abuse by their owners. Further, even animals and living creatures in the wild face horrendous evils and suffering – such as burns and slow death after natural fires or other natural disasters or from predatory injuries – and it is unclear, state Bishop and Perszyk, why an all-loving God would create such free creatures prone to intense suffering.

=== Incompatibilist view of free will ===
A simplified taxonomy of the main positions on the nature of free will

Critics of Plantinga's argument, such as the philosopher Antony Flew, have responded that it presupposes a libertarian, incompatibilist view of free will (free will and determinism are metaphysically incompatible), while their view is a compatibilist view of free will (free will and determinism, whether physical or divine, are metaphysically compatible). The view of compatibilists is that God could have created a world containing moral good but no moral evil. In such a world people could have chosen to only perform good deeds, even though all their choices were predestined.

Plantinga dismisses compatibilism, stating "this objection ... seems utterly implausible. One might as well claim that being in jail doesn't really limit one's freedom on the grounds that if one were not in jail, he'd be free to come and go as he pleased."

=== Transworld depravity ===
Plantinga's idea of weakly actualizing a world can be viewed as having God actualizing a subset of the world, letting the free choices of creatures complete the world. Therefore, it is certainly possible that a person completes the world by only making morally good choices; that is, there exist possible worlds where a person freely chooses to do no moral evil. However, it may be the case that for each such world, there is some morally significant choice that this person would do differently if these circumstances were to occur in the actual world. In other words, each such possible world contains a world segment, meaning everything about that world up to the point where the person must make that critical choice, such that if that segment was part of the actual world, the person would instead go wrong in completing that world. Formally, transworld depravity is defined as follows:

A person P suffers from transworld depravity if and only if the following holds: for every world W such that P is significantly free in W and P does only what is right in W, there is an action A and a maximal world segment S´ such that

1. S´ includes A's being morally significant for P
2. S´ includes P's being free with respect to A
3. S´ is included in W and includes neither P's performing A nor P's refraining from performing A
4. If S´ were actual, P would go wrong with respect to A.

Less formally: Consider all possible (not actual) worlds in which someone always chooses the right. In all those, there will be a subpart of the world that says that person was free to choose a certain right or wrong action, but does not say whether they chose it. If that subpart were actual (in the real world), then they would choose the wrong.

Plantinga responds that "What is important about the idea of transworld depravity is that if a person suffers from it, then it wasn't within God's power to actualize any world in which that person is significantly free but does no wrong – that is, a world in which he produces moral good but no moral evil" and that it is logically possible that every person suffers from transworld depravity.

Mackie admitted defeat, but not because of Plantinga, since transworld depravity is unconvincing. So, Mackie lost, but Plantinga did not win.

=== Leibniz' lapse ===
Plantinga writes in God, Freedom, and Evil that J. L. Mackie has presented the objection that God, being omnipotent and omnibenevolent, would easily be able to create the best of all possible worlds. He reasons that such a world would be one in which all humans use their free will only for good – something they do not do. Hence, the free-will defense fails. Plantinga responds by pointing out two flaws in Mackie's reasoning, which, together, he names Leibniz' Lapse, owing to their reliance upon the misunderstandings of the German philosopher Gottfried Wilhelm Leibniz. The first is the presumption that God can force humans to use their free will only for good – which is an inherent contradiction, because if this were so, their actions would no longer be free. The second that Plantinga labels is the very idea that there is a "best" of all possible worlds – however good the world is, there could always be at least one more good person inside it, so the idea of a "best" is incoherent.

=== Molinism ===
The focus on possible worlds in Plantinga's free will defense unwittingly reinvented the Molinist doctrine of middle knowledge – knowledge of the counterfactuals of human freedom, thereby precipitating a revival in the interest of Molinism. Parts of Luis de Molina's Concordia were translated into English for the first time. Molinism was applied not only to the problem of evil, but also to the incarnation, providence, prayer, Heaven and Hell, perseverance in grace and so on.
