= Warranted Christian Belief =

2000 book by Alvin Plantinga

- Author: Alvin Plantinga
- Language: English
- Publisher: Oxford University Press
- Publication date: 2000
- Preceded by: Warrant and Proper Function

Warranted Christian Belief is a book written by Alvin Plantinga and published in 2000 (Oxford University Press). It constitutes, after Warrant: The Current Debate and Warrant and Proper Function, both published in 1993, the last part of his trilogy on epistemology.

In this book, Plantinga wants first to show that it is rational to accept Christian belief. Plantinga also proposes, with what he calls "the Aquinas/Calvin Model", an "account of the way in which Christian belief is, in fact, justified, rational and warranted".

Warranted Christian Belief has been described as a "full-blooded defense of Christianity".
