= Alan Donagan =

American philosopher

Alan Harry Donagan (10 February 1925 – 29 May 1991) was an Australian-American philosopher, distinguished for his theories on the philosophy of history and the nature of morality.

He attended the University of Melbourne and was Professor of Philosophy at the University of Chicago.

He is most well known for his book The Theory of Morality (1977) where he tries to argue for the common morality of the Hebrew-Christian traditions which Thomas Aquinas and Immanuel Kant shared. Starting from that "primary common principle" which prescribes anybody to treat the humanity "always as an end and never as a means only", he identifies in the Kantian concept of "respect"—namely in the axiom according to which "you are not allowed not to respect each human being, yourself or any, as a rational creature"—the very principle of morality, whereby the idea of personal life as an "objective good", to which anybody ought to be absolutely bound, and that nobody can arbitrarily decide upon. Unlike many of his contemporaries, he was deeply committed to the history of law and ethics which led him to conceptual issues that arise out of practical reflections on moral and juridical issues.

In reviewing Donagan's Philosophical Papers D. W. Hamlyn wrote, "the papers which make up the final two thirds of the second volume of this compilation clearly reveal Donagan's claim to being a major twentieth century philosopher." Volume 104, No.1 of The Journal Ethics was dedicated in honor of his philosophy.

== Writings ==
- The Later Philosophy of R. G. Collingwood (Oxford, 1962)
- Philosophy of History ed. Alan Donagan and Barbara Donagan (Macmillan, 1965)
- The Theory of Morality (Chicago, 1977) Book-review excerpts, contents, & link to preview.
- Choice: The Essential Element in Human Action (Routledge & Kegan Paul, 1987)
- Spinoza (Chicago, 1988)
- The Philosophical Papers of Alan Donagan ed. J. E. Malpas, 2 vols (Chicago, 1994)
- Reflections on Philosophy and Religion ed. Anthony N. Perovich Jr. (Oxford, 1999)
