= Laurence BonJour =

American philosopher

- Born: August 31, 1943 (age 83)

Philosophical work
- Era: Contemporary philosophy
- Region: Western philosophy
- School: Analytic; Epistemic coherentism
- Main interests: Epistemology
- Notable ideas: Coherentism, a priori justification

Laurence BonJour (born August 31, 1943) is an American philosopher and emeritus of Philosophy at the University of Washington.

== Education and career ==
He received his bachelor's degrees in Philosophy and Political Science from Macalester College and his doctorate in 1969 from Princeton University with a dissertation directed by Richard Rorty. Before moving to UW he taught at the University of Texas at Austin.

== Philosophical work ==
BonJour specializes in epistemology, Kant, and British empiricism, but is best known for his contributions to epistemology. Initially defending coherentism in his anti-foundationalist critique The Structure of Empirical Knowledge (1985), BonJour subsequently moved to defend Cartesian foundationalism in later work such as 1998's In Defense of Pure Reason. The latter book is a sustained defense of a priori justification, strongly criticizing empiricists and pragmatists who dismiss it (such as W. V. O. Quine and Richard Rorty).

In 1980, in his essay Externalist Theories of Empirical Knowledge, BonJour criticized the reliabilism of Armstrong and Goldman, proposing internalist approach to epistemic truth and knowledge justification. He formulated the examples of a clairvoyant and her reliable forecasts about the presence of the U.S. president in New York City. To set the problematic of this essay, BonJour said that foundationalism, the most common form of internalism, requires the concept of a basic belief to solve the regress problem in epistemology: he wrote that this central concept is itself by no means unproblematic.

== Publications ==
=== Books ===
- The Structure of Empirical Knowledge (Cambridge, MA: Harvard University Press, 1985), pp. xiii, 258.
- In Defense of Pure Reason (London: Cambridge University Press, 1998), pp. xiv, 232.
- Epistemology: Classic Problems and Contemporary Responses (Lanham, MD: Rowman & Littlefield, 2002), pp. viii, 283.
- Epistemic Justification: Internalism vs. Externalism, Foundations vs. Virtues (jointly with Ernest Sosa). (Oxford: Blackwell, 2003), pp. vii, 240.
- Philosophical Problems: An Annotated Anthology (jointly edited with Ann Baker) (New York: Longman, 2005), pp. xvi, 876.

=== Articles ===
- "Sellars on Truth and Picturing", International Philosophical Quarterly, vol. 13 (1973), pp. 243–65.
- "Rescher's Idealistic Pragmatism", The Review of Metaphysics, vol. 29 (1976), pp. 702–26.
- "Determinism, Libertarianism, and Agent Causation", The Southern Journal of Philosophy, vol. 14 (1976), pp. 145–56.
- "The Coherence Theory of Empirical Knowledge", Philosophical Studies, vol. 30 (1976), pp. 281–312; reprinted in Paul Moser (ed.) Empirical Knowledge (Rowman & Littlefield, 1986), in Louis Pojman (ed.), The Theory of Knowledge (Belmont, California: Wadsworth, 1993), and in Michael Goodman and Robert A. Snyder (eds.) Contemporary Readings in Epistemology (Prentice-Hall, 1993).
- "Can Empirical Knowledge Have a Foundation?" American Philosophical Quarterly, vol. 15 (1978), pp. 1–13; reprinted in Paul Moser (ed.), Empirical Knowledge (Totowa, N. J.: Rowman & Littlefield, 1986) and in Louis Pojman (ed.), The Theory of Knowledge (Belmont, California: Wadsworth, 1993).
- "Rescher's Philosophical System", in E. Sosa (ed.), The Philosophy of Nicholas Rescher (Dordrecht, the Netherlands: D. Reidel, 1979), pp. 157–72.
- "Externalist Theories of Empirical Knowledge", Midwest Studies in Philosophy, vol. 5 (1980), pp. 53–73.
- "Reply to Christlieb", The Southern Journal of Philosophy, vol. 24 (1986), pp. 415–29.
- "A Reconsideration of the Problem of Induction", Philosophical Topics, vol. 14 (1986), pp. 93–124.
- "Nozick, Externalism, and Skepticism", in S. Luper-Foy (ed.), The Possibility of Knowledge: Nozick and His Critics (Totowa, N. J.: Rowman & Littlefield, 1987), pp. 297–313.
- "Reply to Steup", Philosophical Studies, vol.
- "Reply to Moser", Analysis, vol. 48 (1988), pp. 164–65.
- "Replies and Clarifications", in J. W. Bender (ed.), The Current State of the Coherence Theory: Essays on the Epistemic Theories of Keith Lehrer and Laurence BonJour (Dordrecht, Holland: Kluwer, 1989), pp. 276–92.
- "Reply to Solomon", Philosophy and Phenomenological Research.
- "Is Thought a Symbolic Process?" Synthese, vol. 89 (1991), pp. 331–52.
- "A Rationalist Manifesto", Canadian Journal of Philosophy Supplementary Volume 18 (1992), pp. 53–88.
- "Fumerton on Coherence Theories", Journal of Philosophical Research, vol. 19 (1994), pp. 104–108.
- "Against Naturalized Epistemology", Midwest Studies in Philosophy, vol. 19 (1994), pp. 283–300.
- "Sosa on Knowledge, Justification, and 'Aptness'", Philosophical Studies, vol. 78 (1995), pp. 207–220.
- "Toward a Moderate Rationalism", Philosophical Topics, vol. 23 (1995), pp. 47–78.
- "Plantinga on Knowledge and Proper Function", in Jonathan Kvanvig (ed.), Warrant in Contemporary Epistemology ( Rowman & Littlefield, 1996), pp. 47–71.
- "Haack on Justification and Experience", Synthese.
- "The Dialectic of Foundationalism and Coherentism", in the Blackwell Guide to Epistemology, ed. John Greco and Ernest Sosa, Blackwell.
- "Toward a Defense of Empirical Foundationalism", in Michael DePaul (ed.), Resurrecting Old-Fashioned Foundationalism (Lanham, Maryland: Rowman & Littlefield, 2000). With a reply to criticisms by John Pollock and Alvin Plantinga.
- "Foundationalism and the External World", in James Tomberlin (ed.), Philosophical Perspectives, vol. 13 (2000).
- Critical study of Evan Fales, A Defense of the Given, Nous.
- "The Indispensability of Internalism", Philosophical Topics.
- "Internalism and Externalism", in the Oxford Handbook of Epistemology, ed. Paul Moser.
- Analytic Philosophy and the Nature of Thought (Unpublished)
- What is it Like to be a Human (Instead of a Bat)? (Unpublished)

=== Encyclopedia and dictionary articles ===
- "Externalism/Internalism" and "Problems of Induction", in E. Sosa & J. Dancy (eds.), A Companion To Epistemology (Oxford: Blackwell, 1992).
- "A Priori/A Posteriori", "Coherence Theory of Truth" and "Broad, Charlie Dunbar" in The Cambridge Dictionary Of Philosophy, ed. Robert Audi, Cambridge University Press, 1995.
- "Coherence Theory of Truth and Knowledge", in the Routledge Encyclopedia of Philosophy.
- "Epistemological Problems of Perception", in the on-line Stanford Encyclopedia of Philosophy.

=== Reviews ===
- Of Gilbert Harman, Thought, Philosophical Review, vol. 84 (1975), pp. 256–58.
- Of R. M. Dworkin (ed.), Philosophy of Law; and Kenneth Kipnis (ed.), Philosophical Issues in Law, Teaching Philosophy, vol. 2 (1977–78), pp. 325–28.
- Of James Cornman, Skepticism, Justification, and Explanation, Philosophical Review, vol. 91 (1982), pp. 612–15.
- Of D. J. O'Connor and Brian Carr, Introduction to the Theory of Knowledge, Teaching Philosophy, vol. 7 (1984), pp. 64–66.
- Of Paul Ziff, Epistemic Analysis, Canadian Philosophical Reviews
- Of Lorraine Code, Epistemic Responsibility, Philosophical Review.
- Of Alan Goldman, Empirical Knowledge, Philosophy and Phenomenological Research.
- Of Robert Fogelin, Pyrrhonian Reflections on Knowledge and Justification, Times Literary Supplement.
- Of Michael DePaul and William Ramsey (eds.), Rethinking Intuition, British Journal for the Philosophy of Science.
- Of Paul Boghossian and Christopher Peacocke (eds.), New Essays on the A Priori, forthcoming in Mind.

== See also ==
- American philosophy
- List of American philosophers
