= Reliabilism =

Theory that beliefs are justified when from reliable processes

Reliabilism, a category of theories in the philosophical discipline of epistemology, has been advanced as a theory both of justification and of knowledge. Process reliabilism has been used as an argument against philosophical skepticism, such as the brain in a vat thought experiment. Process reliabilism is a form of epistemic externalism.

== Overview ==
A broadly reliabilist theory of knowledge is roughly as follows:

Given that p stands for any proposition (such as, "the sky is blue"), then one knows that p if and only if p is true, one believes that p is true, and one has arrived at the belief that p is true through some 'reliable process.'

A broadly reliabilist theory of justified belief can be stated as follows:

One has a justified belief that p if, and only if, the belief is the result of a reliable process

Moreover, a similar account can be given (and an elaborate version of this has been given by Alvin Plantinga) for such notions as 'warranted belief' or 'epistemically rational belief'.

Leading proponents of reliabilist theories of knowledge and justification have included Alvin Goldman, Marshall Swain, Kent Bach and more recently, Alvin Plantinga. Goldman's article "A Causal Theory of Knowing" (Journal of Philosophy, 64 (1967), pp. 357–372) is generally credited as being the first full treatment of the theory, though D. M. Armstrong is also regarded as an important source, and (according to Hugh Mellor) Frank Ramsey was the very first to state the theory, albeit in passing.

One classical or traditional analysis of 'knowledge' is justified true belief. In order to have a valid claim of knowledge for any proposition, one must be justified in believing "p" and "p" must be true. Since Gettier proposed his counterexamples the traditional analysis has included the further claim that knowledge must be more than justified true belief. Reliabilist theories of knowledge are sometimes presented as an alternative to that theory: rather than justification, all that is required is that the belief be the product of a reliable process. But reliabilism need not be regarded as an alternative, but instead as a further explication of the traditional analysis. On this view, those who offer reliabilist theories of justification further analyze the 'justification' part of the traditional analysis of 'knowledge' in terms of reliable processes. Not all reliabilists agree with such accounts of justification, but some do.

== Objections ==
Some find reliabilisms of justification objectionable because it entails externalism, which is the view that one can have knowledge, or have a justified belief, despite not knowing (having "access" to) the evidence, or other circumstances, that make the belief justified. Most reliabilists maintain that a belief can be justified, or can constitute knowledge, even if the believer does not know about or understand the process that makes the belief reliable. In defending this view, reliabilists (and externalists generally) are apt to point to examples from simple acts of perception: if one sees a bird in the tree outside one's window and thereby gains the belief that there is a bird in that tree, one might not at all understand the cognitive processes that account for one's successful act of perception; nevertheless, it is the fact that the processes worked reliably that accounts for why one's belief is justified. In short, one finds one holds a belief about the bird, and that belief is justified if any is, but one is not acquainted at all with the processes that led to the belief that justified one's having it.

Another of the most common objections to reliabilism, made first to Goldman's reliable process theory of knowledge and later to other reliabilist theories, is the so-called generality problem. For any given justified belief (or instance of knowledge), one can easily identify many different (concurrently operating) "processes" from which the belief results. My belief that there is a bird in the tree outside my window might be accorded a result of the process of forming beliefs on the basis of sense-perception, of visual sense-perception, of visual sense-perception through non-opaque surfaces in daylight, and so forth, down to a variety of different very specifically described processes. Some of these processes might be statistically reliable, while others might not. It would no doubt be better to say, in any case, that we are choosing not which process to say resulted in the belief, but instead how to describe the process, out of the many different levels of generality on which it can be accurately described.

An objection in a similar line was formulated by Stephen Stich in The Fragmentation of Reason. Reliabilism usually considers that for generating justified beliefs a process needs to be reliable in a set of relevant possible scenarios. However, according to Stich, these scenarios are chosen in a culturally biased manner. Stich does not defend any alternative theory of knowledge or justification, but instead argues that all accounts of normative epistemic terms are culturally biased and instead only a pragmatic account can be given.

Another objection to reliabilism is called the new evil demon problem. The evil demon problem originally motivated skepticism, but can be repurposed to object to reliabilist accounts as follows: If our experiences are controlled by an evil demon, it may be the case that we believe ourselves to be doing things that we are not doing. However, these beliefs are clearly justified. Robert Brandom has called for a clarification of the role of belief in reliabilist theories. Brandom is concerned that unless the role of belief is stressed, reliabilism may attribute knowledge to things that would otherwise be considered incapable of possessing it. Brandom gives the example of a parrot that has been trained to consistently respond to red visual stimuli by saying 'that's red'. The proposition is true, the mechanism that produced it is reliable, but Brandom is reluctant to say that the parrot knows it is seeing red because he thinks it cannot believe that it is. For Brandom, beliefs pertain to concepts: without the latter there can be no former. Concepts are products of the 'game of giving and asking for reasons'. Hence, only those entities capable of reasoning, through language in a social context, can for Brandom believe and thus have knowledge. Brandom may be regarded as hybridising externalism and internalism, allowing knowledge to be accounted for by reliable external process so long as a knower possess some internal understanding of why the belief is reliable.

== See also ==
- Reformed epistemology
