= Foundationalism =

Epistemological theory

Foundationalism concerns philosophical theories of knowledge resting upon non-inferential justified belief, or some secure foundation of certainty such as a conclusion inferred from a basis of sound premises. The main rival of the foundationalist theory of justification is the coherence theory of justification, whereby a body of knowledge, not requiring a secure foundation, can be established by the interlocking strength of its components, like a puzzle solved without prior certainty that each small region was solved correctly.

Identifying the alternatives as either circular reasoning or infinite regress, and thus exhibiting the regress problem, Aristotle made foundationalism his own clear choice, positing basic beliefs underpinning others. Descartes, the most famed foundationalist, discovered a foundation in the fact of his own existence and in the "clear and distinct" ideas of reason, whereas Locke found a foundation in experience. Differing foundations may reflect differing epistemological emphases—empiricists emphasizing experience, rationalists emphasizing reason—but may blend both.

In the 1930s, debate over foundationalism revived. Whereas Moritz Schlick viewed scientific knowledge like a pyramid where a special class of statements does not require verification through other beliefs and serves as a foundation, Otto Neurath argued that scientific knowledge lacks an ultimate foundation and acts like a raft. In the 1950s, the dominance of foundationalism was challenged by a number of philosophers such as Willard Van Orman Quine and Wilfrid Sellars. Quine's ontological relativity found any belief networked to one's beliefs on all of reality, while auxiliary beliefs somewhere in the vast network are readily modified to protect desired beliefs.

Classically, foundationalism had posited infallibility of basic beliefs and deductive reasoning between beliefs—a strong foundationalism. Around 1975, weak foundationalism emerged. Thus recent foundationalists have variously allowed fallible basic beliefs, and inductive reasoning between them, either by enumerative induction or by inference to the best explanation. And whereas internalists require cognitive access to justificatory means, externalists find justification without such access.

Some modern forums of foundationalism are foundational pluralism (see: logical pluralism) in which no single logical foundations exists, and foundational coherentism which recognizes the coherence theory of justification (pure coherentism has a problem on approaching different logical foundations according to foundational coherentists), but also various foundational contexts which are infinite in logical pluralism.

== History ==
Foundationalism was initiated by French early modern philosopher René Descartes. In his Meditations, Descartes challenged the contemporary principles of philosophy by arguing that everything he knew he learnt from or through his senses. He used various arguments to challenge the reliability of the senses, citing previous errors and the possibilities that he was dreaming or being deceived by an Evil Demon which rendered all of his beliefs about the external world false. Descartes attempted to establish the secure foundations for knowledge to avoid scepticism. He contrasted the information provided by senses, which is unclear and uncertain, with the truths of geometry, which are clear and distinct. Geometrical truths are also certain and indubitable; Descartes thus attempted to find truths which were clear and distinct because they would be indubitably true and a suitable foundation for knowledge. His method was to question all of his beliefs until he reached something clear and distinct that was indubitably true. The result was his cogito ergo sum—'I think therefore I am', or the belief that he was thinking—as his indubitable belief suitable as a foundation for knowledge. This resolved Descartes' problem of the Evil Demon. Even if his beliefs about the external world were false, his beliefs about what he was experiencing were still indubitably true, even if those perceptions do not relate to anything in the world.

Several other philosophers of the early modern period, including John Locke, G. W. Leibniz, George Berkeley, David Hume, and Thomas Reid, accepted foundationalism as well. Baruch Spinoza was interpreted as metaphysical foundationalist by G. W. F. Hegel, a proponent of coherentism. Immanuel Kant's foundationalism rests on his theory of categories.

In late modern philosophy, foundationalism was defended by J. G. Fichte in his book Grundlage der gesamten Wissenschaftslehre (1794/1795), Wilhelm Windelband in his book Über die Gewißheit der Erkenntniss (1873), and Gottlob Frege in his book Die Grundlagen der Arithmetik (1884).

In contemporary philosophy, foundationalism has been defended by Edmund Husserl and Bertrand Russell.

== Definition ==
Foundationalism is an attempt to respond to the regress problem of justification in epistemology. According to this argument, every proposition requires justification to support it, but any justification also needs to be justified itself. If this goes on ad infinitum, it is not clear how anything in the chain could be justified. Foundationalism holds that there are 'basic beliefs' which serve as foundations to anchor the rest of our beliefs. Strong versions of the theory assert that an indirectly justified belief is completely justified by basic beliefs; more moderate theories hold that indirectly justified beliefs require basic beliefs to be justified, but can be further justified by other factors.

Since ancient Greece, Western philosophy has pursued a solid foundation as the ultimate and eternal reference system for all knowledge. This foundation serves not only as a starting point but also as the fundamental basis for understanding the truth of existence. Thinking is the process of proving the validity of knowledge, not proving the rationality of the foundation from which knowledge is shaped. This means, with ultimate cause, the foundation is true, absolute, entire and impossible to prove. Neopragmatist philosopher Richard Rorty, a proponent of anti-foundationalism, said that the fundamentalism confirmed the existence of the privileged representation which constitutes the foundation, from which dominates epistemology. The earliest foundationalism is Plato's theory of Forms, which shows the general concept as a model for the release of existence, which is only the faint copy of the Forms of eternity, that means, understanding the expression of objects leads to acquiring all knowledge, then acquiring knowledge accompanies achieving the truth. Achieving the truth means understanding the foundation. This idea still has some appeal in for example international relations studies.

=== Classical foundationalism ===
Foundationalism holds basic beliefs exist, which are justified without reference to other beliefs, and that nonbasic beliefs must ultimately be justified by basic beliefs. Classical foundationalism maintains that basic beliefs must be infallible if they are to justify nonbasic beliefs, and that only deductive reasoning can be used to transfer justification from one belief to another. Laurence BonJour has argued that the classical formulation of foundationalism requires basic beliefs to be infallible, incorrigible, indubitable, and certain if they are to be adequately justified. Mental states and immediate experience are often taken as good candidates for basic beliefs because it is argued that beliefs about these do not need further support to be justified.

=== Modest foundationalism ===
As an alternative to the classic view, modest foundationalism does not require that basic perceptual beliefs are infallible, but holds that it is reasonable to assume that perceptual beliefs are justified unless evidence to the contrary exists. This is still foundationalism because it maintains that all non-basic beliefs must be ultimately justified by basic beliefs, but it does not require that basic beliefs are infallible and allows inductive reasoning as an acceptable form of inference. For example, a belief that 'I see red' could be defeated with psychological evidence showing my mind to be confused or inattentive. Modest foundationalism can also be used to avoid the problem of inference. Even if perceptual beliefs are infallible, it is not clear that they can infallibly ground empirical knowledge (even if my belief that the table looks red to me is infallible, the inference to the belief that the table actually is red might not be infallible). Modest foundationalism does not require this link between perception and reality to be so strong; our perception of a table being yellow is adequate justification to believe that this is the case, even if it is not infallible.

Reformed epistemology is a form of modest foundationalism which takes certain religious beliefs, such as belief in God, as properly basic because they need not be inferred from other beliefs. This takes a modest approach to foundationalism—religious beliefs are not taken to be infallible, but are assumed to be prima facie justified unless evidence arises to the contrary.

=== Internalism and externalism ===
Foundationalism can take internalist and externalist forms. Internalism requires that a believer's justification for a belief must be accessible to them for it to be justified. Foundationalist internalists have held that basic beliefs are justified by mental events or states, such as experiences, that do not constitute beliefs. Alternatively, basic beliefs may be justified by some special property of the belief itself, such as its being self-evident or infallible. Externalism maintains that it is unnecessary for the means of justification of a belief to be accessible to the believer.

Reliabilism is an externalist foundationalist theory, initially proposed by Alvin Goldman, which argues that a belief is justified if it is reliably produced, meaning that it will be probably true. Goldman distinguished between two kinds of justification for beliefs: belief-dependent and belief-independent. A belief-dependent process uses prior beliefs to produce new beliefs; a belief-independent process does not, using other stimuli instead. Beliefs produced this way are justified because the processes that cause them are reliable; this might be because we have evolved to reach good conclusions when presented with sense-data, meaning the conclusions we draw from our senses are usually true.

== Criticisms ==
Critics of foundationalism often argue that for a belief to be justified it must be supported by other beliefs; in Donald Davidson's phrase, "only a belief can be a reason for another belief". For instance, Wilfrid Sellars argued that non-doxastic mental states cannot be reasons, and so noninferential warrant cannot be derived from them. Similarly, critics of externalist foundationalism argue that only mental states or properties the believer is aware of could make a belief justified.

Postmodernists and post-structuralists such as Richard Rorty and Jacques Derrida have attacked foundationalism on the grounds that the truth of a statement or discourse is only verifiable in accordance with other statements and discourses. Rorty in particular elaborates further on this, claiming that the individual, the community, the human body as a whole have a 'means by which they know the world' (this entails language, culture, semiotic systems, mathematics, science etc.). In order to verify particular means, or particular statements belonging to certain means (e.g., the propositions of the natural sciences), a person would have to 'step outside' the means and critique them neutrally, in order to provide a foundation for adopting them. However, this is impossible. The only way in which one can know the world is through the means by which they know the world; a method cannot justify itself. This argument can be seen as directly related to Wittgenstein's theory of language, drawing a parallel between postmodernism and late logical positivism that is united in critique of foundationalism.

== See also ==
- Constructivist epistemology
- Ethical intuitionism
- Evidentialism
- Foundherentism
- Panrationalism
- Pragmatism

== Bibliography ==
- Audi, Robert (2003). Epistemology: A Contemporary Introduction to the Theory of Knowledge. Routledge. ISBN 978-0-415-28109-6.
- BonJour, Laurence (1985). The Structure of Empirical Knowledge. Harvard University Press. ISBN 978-0-67484-381-3.
- Coelho, Ivo (2010). "Foundationalism". In Puthenpurackal, Johnson J. (ed.). ACPI Encyclopaedia of Philosophy. Asian Trading Corporation. ISBN 978-8-17086-574-2.
- Dancy, Jonathan (1985). Introduction to Contemporary Epistemology. Blackwell. ISBN 0-631-13622-3.
- Franke, John R.; Grenz, Stanley James (2001). Beyond Foundationalism: Shaping Theology in a Postmodern Context. Westminster John Knox Press. ISBN 9780664257699.
- Greco, John (2000). Putting Skeptics in Their Place. Cambridge, UK: Cambridge University Press. ISBN 978-0-521-04553-7.
- Lemos, Noah Mercelino (2007). An Introduction to the Theory of Knowledge. Cambridge University Press. ISBN 978-1-13946-185-6.
- O'Brien, Dan (2006). An introduction to the Theory of Knowledge. Polity. ISBN 978-0-74563-316-9.
