= Basic belief =

Axioms under the epistemological view called foundationalism

Basic beliefs (also commonly called foundational beliefs or core beliefs) are, under the epistemological view called foundationalism, the axioms of a belief system.

== Categories of beliefs ==
Foundationalism holds that all beliefs must be justified in order to be known. Beliefs therefore fall into two categories:

- Beliefs that are properly basic, in that they do not depend upon justification of other beliefs, but on something outside the realm of belief (a "non-doxastic justification").
- Beliefs that derive from one or more basic beliefs, and therefore depend on the basic beliefs for their validity.

== Description ==
Within this basic framework of foundationalism exist a number of views regarding which types of beliefs qualify as properly basic; that is, what sorts of beliefs can be justifiably held without the justification of other beliefs.

In classical foundationalism, beliefs are held to be properly basic if they are either self-evident axioms, or evident to the senses (empiricism). However Anthony Kenny and others have argued that this is a self-refuting idea.

- In modern foundationalism, beliefs are held to be properly basic if they are either self-evident axiom or incorrigible. One such axiom is René Descartes's Cogito ergo sum ("I think, therefore I am"). Incorrigible (lit. uncorrectable) beliefs are those one can believe without possibly being proven wrong. Descartes argued that beliefs about the external world based on the senses can be mistaken, but many classical foundationalists still treat direct experiential senses, such as feeling pain or having a visual sensation, as incorrigible and properly basic.
- In what Keith Lehrer has called "fallible foundationalism", also known as "moderate foundationalism", the division between inferential and non-inferential belief is retained, but the requirement of incorrigibility is dropped. This, it is claimed, allows the senses to resume their traditional role as the basis of non-inferential belief despite their fallibility.
- In Reformed epistemology, beliefs are held to be properly basic if they are reasonable and consistent with a sensible world view.

Anti-foundationalism rejects foundationalism and denies there is some fundamental belief or principle which is the basic ground or foundation of inquiry and knowledge.

== See also ==
- Doxastic logic
- First principle
- Mental model
- Mental representation
- Mindset
- Paradigm
- Set (psychology)
- Schema (psychology)
- Worldview
