= Warrant and Proper Function =

1993 book by Alvin Plantinga

- Author: Alvin Plantinga
- Publication date: 1993
- Followed by: Warranted Christian Belief

Warrant and Proper Function (1993) is the second book in a trilogy written by philosopher Alvin Plantinga on epistemology.

== Overview ==
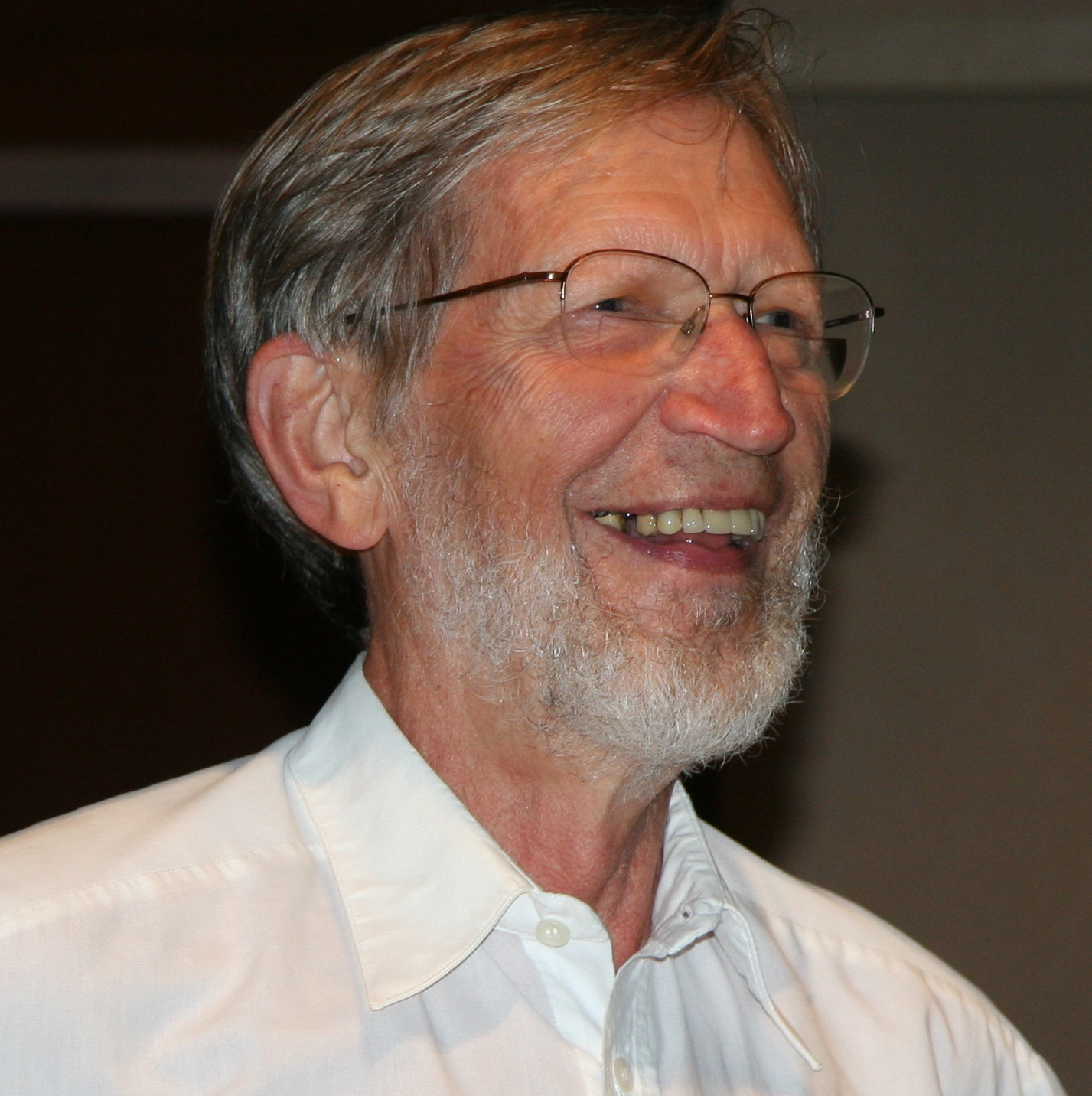
Alvin Plantinga, the author, in 2009

In this book, Plantinga introduces the notion of warrant as an alternative to justification and discusses topics like self-knowledge, memories, perception, and probability. Plantinga's "proper function" account argues that as a necessary condition of having warrant, one's "belief-forming and belief-maintaining apparatus of powers" are functioning properly—"working the way it ought to work". Plantinga explains his argument for proper function with reference to a "design plan", as well as an environment in which one's cognitive equipment is optimal for use. Plantinga asserts that the design plan does not require a designer: "it is perhaps possible that evolution (undirected by God or anyone else) has somehow furnished us with our design plans", but the paradigm case of a design plan is like a technological product designed by a human being (like a radio or a wheel). Ultimately, Plantinga argues that epistemological naturalism- i.e. epistemology that holds that warrant is dependent on natural faculties – is best supported by supernaturalist metaphysics – in this case the belief in a creator God or designer who has laid out a design plan that includes cognitive faculties conducive to attaining knowledge.

According to Plantinga, a belief, B, is warranted if:

(1) the cognitive faculties involved in the production of B are functioning properly…; (2) your cognitive environment is sufficiently similar to the one for which your cognitive faculties are designed; (3) … the design plan governing the production of the belief in question involves, as purpose or function, the production of true beliefs…; and (4) the design plan is a good one: that is, there is a high statistical or objective probability that a belief produced in accordance with the relevant segment of the design plan in that sort of environment is true.

Plantinga seeks to defend this view of proper function against alternative views of proper function proposed by other philosophers which he groups together as "naturalistic", including the "functional generalization" view of John Pollock, the evolutionary/etiological account provided by Ruth Millikan, and a dispositional view held by John Bigelow and Robert Pargetter. Plantinga also discusses his evolutionary argument against naturalism in the later chapters of Warrant and Proper Function.

== See also ==
- Burden of proof (philosophy)
