= Outline of epistemology =

Overview of and topical guide to epistemology

The following outline is provided as an overview of and topical guide to epistemology:

Epistemology (a.k.a. theory of knowledge) – branch of philosophy concerned with knowledge. The term was introduced into English by the Scottish philosopher James Frederick Ferrier (1808–1864). Epistemology asks questions such as: "What is knowledge?", "How is knowledge acquired?", and "What do people know?"

== Core topics of epistemology ==
- Knowledge (outline)
  - Sources of knowledge (Pramana in Sanskrit)
    - Perception
    - Memory
    - Introspection
    - Inference
    - Testimony
  - Types of knowledge
    - Descriptive knowledge – "Knowledge that"
    - Procedural knowledge – "Knowledge how"
    - Knowledge by acquaintance
  - A priori and a posteriori
  - Analytic–synthetic distinction
  - Gettier problem
- Justification
  - infinite regress
    - Münchhausen trilemma
  - Theories of justification
    - Foundationalism – Basic beliefs justify other, non-basic beliefs.
    - Coherentism – Beliefs are justified if they cohere with other beliefs a person holds, each belief is justified if it coheres with the overall system of beliefs.
    - Infinitism – Beliefs are justified by infinite chains of reasons.
    - Foundherentism – Both fallible foundations and coherence are components of justification—proposed by Susan Haack.
    - Internalism and externalism – The believer must be able to justify a belief through internal knowledge (internalism), or outside sources of knowledge can be used to justify a belief (externalism).
    - Innatism – The mind is born with knowledge.
    - Reformed epistemology – Beliefs are warranted by proper cognitive function—proposed by Alvin Plantinga.
    - Evidentialism – Beliefs depend solely on the evidence for them.
    - Reliabilism – A belief is justified if it is the result of a reliable process.
    - Infallibilism – Knowledge is incompatible with the possibility of being wrong.
    - Fallibilism – Claims can be accepted even though they cannot be conclusively proven or justified.
    - Non-justificationism – Knowledge is produced by attacking claims and refuting them instead of justifying them.
  - Falsification (Falsifiability)
  - Proof (truth)
    - Standard of proof
- Truth
  - Criteria of truth
- Belief
  - Belief revision
- Virtue epistemology
  - Unity of knowledge and action

== Schools of thought ==
- Empiricism
- Rationalism
- Epistemological skepticism
- Pragmatism
- Naturalized epistemology
- Contextualism
- Relativism
- Constructivist epistemology
- Idealism
- Bayesian epistemology
- Feminist epistemology
- Innatism
- Naïve realism
- Phenomenalism
- Positivism
- Critical rationalism

== Domains of inquiry in epistemology ==
- Formal epistemology – subdiscipline of epistemology that uses formal methods from logic, probability theory and computability theory to elucidate traditional epistemic problems
  - Computational epistemology
- Historical epistemology – study of the historical conditions of, and changes in, different kinds of knowledge
- Meta-epistemology – metaphilosophical study of the subject, matter, methods and aims of epistemology and of approaches to understanding and structuring knowledge of knowledge itself
- Social epistemology – study of collective knowledge and the social dimensions of knowledge

== Related fields ==
- Philosophy of science
- Sociology of knowledge

== See also ==
- Applied epistemology
- Epistemic logic
- History of epistemology
- Personal epistemology
