= KK thesis =

The KK thesis or KK principle (also known as epistemic transparency or positive introspection) is a principle of epistemic logic which states that "If you know that P is the case then you know that you know that P is the case." This means that one cannot know that P is, if one does not know whether one's knowledge of P is correct. Its application in science can be expressed in the way that it must not only justify its knowledge claims but it must also justify its method of justifying. The principle is also described as knowledge-reflexivity contention.

== Principle ==
In formal notation, the principle can be stated as: "Kp→KKp" (literally: "Knowing p implies the knowing of knowing p"). It is said that the wide acceptance of the thesis steered many philosophers of science towards skepticism since the thesis features infinite regress and that to know is interpreted as "to know with certainty that one knows". The principle also holds that informational independence has epistemological consequences. An application of the principle may involve Hume's skepticism, which holds that it is not possible to know the induction hypothesis needed to determine the derivative knowledge that P from what is already known. This finally leads to the Humean skeptical conclusion if it is attained using KK hypothesis.

An account goes as far as saying that the thesis is false due to these reasons since any argument that depends upon it is unsatisfactory. It is also said that the thesis had been disputed since the introduction of the epistemic logic by Jaakko Hintikka in 1962. There are contemporary epistemologists who pointed out that skepticism can be rejected by rejecting the KK principle but to do so means one is also rejecting the idea of knowledge.

== Acceptance ==
While major philosophers of the past (Plato, Aristotle, Augustine, Schopenhauer) endorsed the principle, in the beginning of the 21st century the acceptance of the KK thesis widely varies between epistemologists. Some reject it outright: Daniel Greco (who might be supporting the thesis) says that principle had "seen better days", and Louise Antony speaks of it as "roundly rejected". Most externalists also reject the thesis, but statements by internalists, while not explicitly declaring acceptance, contain supportive language.

Timothy Williamson presented a "very influential" attack on the KK principle in 2000 in his book "Knowledge and its Limits".

== History ==
The KK thesis has been associated with the notion of the infallibility of knowledge since ancient philosophers sometimes characterized the latter according to the former's terms. Plato's view on infallibility, for example, can be approached according to its framework, particularly concerning his position stated in Theatetus that truth can only be attained by infallibly knowing it.

Jaakko Hintikka, argued that the plausibility of the KK thesis turns upon the acceptance of a strong notion of knowledge and that it is also in part constitutive of that notion. He traced the thesis' earliest iteration in Plato's Charmides and the Book of Lambda of Aristotle's Metaphysics. He also cited examples drawn from other points of philosophical history, citing the works of Augustine, Averoes, Thomas Aquinas, and Baruch Spinoza, among others. In response to the critique about the implausibility of the KK thesis, Hintikka stated that it is not an important point because what matters is that the principle is able "to capture a strong sense of knowledge".

Modern formulations of the thesis sometimes include qualifications requiring, for example, "normal conditions for psychological self-knowledge".

== See also ==
- Certainty
- Circular argument
- Epistemic closure
- Infallibilism
- Self-reference

== Sources ==
- Azzouni, Jody (2020-10-15). "Usage Traps in the Language of Iterated Knowledge Attributions". Attributing Knowledge. Oxford University Press. pp. 171–205. doi:10.1093/oso/9780197508817.003.0006. ISBN 978-0-19-750881-7.
- Cresto, Eleonora (2012-04-03). "A Defense of Temperate Epistemic Transparency". Journal of Philosophical Logic. 41 (6). Springer Science and Business Media LLC: 923–955. doi:10.1007/s10992-012-9225-7. ISSN 0022-3611. JSTOR 41810059. S2CID 254738258.
