= Infinite regress (disambiguation) =

An infinite regress is when a situation implies an unending chain of entities:

- Infinite regress is the general problem of infinite regress
- Infinite regress (epistemology) is the epistemological problem of infinite regress
- Infinite Regress (Star Trek: Voyager) is the 101st episode of Star Trek: Voyager, the seventh episode of the fifth season
- apparent infinite regress found with an infinity mirror
- summing infinite regress convergent sequence
- infinite regress of cause and effect in feedback

== See also ==
- "An Infinite Regress", a song by Animals as Leaders from Weightless, 2011
