= Agrippa the Skeptic =

Hellenistic Pyrrhonist philosopher, creator of Agrippa's Trilemma

Agrippa
- Born: 1st century BC

Philosophical work
- Era: Hellenistic philosophy
- Region: Western philosophy
- School: Pyrrhonism
- Main interests: Epistemology
- Notable ideas: The five modes of Agrippa; Agrippan trilemma

Agrippa (Greek: Ἀγρίππας) was a Pyrrhonist philosopher who probably lived towards the end of the 1st century CE. He is regarded as the author of "The Five Tropes (or Modes, in Greek: τρόποι) of Agrippa", which are purported to establish the necessity of suspending judgment (epoché). Agrippa's arguments form the basis of the Agrippan trilemma.

== The five modes of Agrippa ==
Sextus Empiricus described these "modes" or "tropes" in Outlines of Pyrrhonism, attributing them "to the more recent skeptics"; Diogenes Laërtius attributes them to Agrippa.

The five modes of Agrippa (also known as the five tropes of Agrippa) are:

1. Dissent – The uncertainty demonstrated by the differences of opinions among philosophers and people in general.
2. Progress ad infinitum – All proof rests on matters themselves in need of proof, and so on to infinity, i.e., the regress argument.
3. Relation – All things are changed as their relations become changed, or, as we look upon them from different points of view.
4. Assumption – The truth asserted is based on an unsupported assumption.
5. Circularity – The truth asserted involves a circularity of proofs.

According to the mode deriving from dispute, we find that undecidable dissension about the matter proposed has come about both in ordinary life and among philosophers. Because of this we are not able to choose or to rule out anything, and we end up with suspension of judgement. In the mode deriving from infinite regress, we say that what is brought forward as a source of conviction for the matter proposed itself needs another such source, which itself needs another, and so ad infinitum, so that we have no point from which to begin to establish anything, and suspension of judgement follows. In the mode deriving from relativity, as we said above, the existing object appears to be such-and-such relative to the subject judging and to the things observed together with it, but we suspend judgement on what it is like in its nature. We have the mode from hypothesis when the Dogmatists, being thrown back ad infinitum, begin from something which they do not establish but claim to assume simply and without proof in virtue of a concession. The reciprocal mode occurs when what ought to be confirmatory of the object under investigation needs to be made convincing by the object under investigation; then, being unable to take either in order to establish the other, we suspend judgement about both.

The first and third tropes summarize the earlier Ten Modes of Aenesidemus. The three additional ones show a progress in the Pyrrhonist system, building upon the objections derived from the fallibility of sense and opinion to more abstract and metaphysical grounds.

According to Victor Brochard "the five tropes can be regarded as the most radical and most precise formulation of philosophical skepticism that has ever been given. In a sense, they are still irresistible today."

== See also ==
- Aenesidemus
- Sextus Empiricus
- Theory of justification
- Munchhausen Trilemma

== Bibliography ==
- Sextus Empiricus, Outlines of Pyrrhonism
- Diogenes Laërtius, Lives of the Philosophers.
- Victor Brochard, The Greek Skeptics, French original: 1887.
- L. E. Goodman, "Skepticism", Review of Metaphysics 36:819–848, 1983.
- Jonathan Barnes, The Toils of Scepticism, Cambridge, 1990.
