= Münchhausen trilemma =

Thought experiment used to demonstrate the impossibility of proving any truth

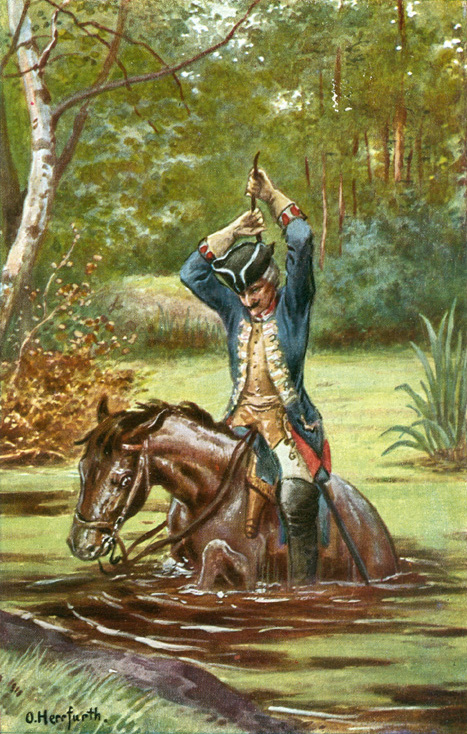
Baron Munchausen pulls himself out of a mire by his own hair.

The Münchhausen trilemma (also known as Agrippa's trilemma) is an epistemological thought experiment intended to demonstrate the theoretical impossibility of proving any truth, even in the fields of logic and mathematics, without appealing to accepted assumptions. If it is asked how any given proposition is known to be true, proof in support of that proposition may be provided. Yet that same question can be asked of that supporting proof and any subsequent supporting proof. The Münchhausen trilemma states that there are only three ways of completing a proof:

- The circular argument, in which the proof of some proposition presupposes the truth of that very proposition
- The regressive argument, in which each proof requires a further proof, ad infinitum
- The dogmatic argument, which rests on accepted precepts which are merely asserted rather than defended

The trilemma, then, is having to choose one of three equally unsatisfying options, all of which are supposed to violate reason.

== Name ==
The name Münchhausen-Trilemma was coined by the German philosopher Hans Albert in 1968 in reference to a trilemma of "dogmatism versus infinite regress versus psychologism" used by Karl Popper. It is a reference to the problem of "bootstrapping", based on the story of Baron Munchausen (in German, "Münchhausen") pulling himself and the horse on which he was sitting out of a mire by his own hair. Like Munchausen, who cannot make progress because he has no solid ground to stand on, any purported justification of all knowledge must fail, because it must start from a position of no knowledge, and therefore cannot make progress. It must either start with some knowledge, as with dogmatism, not start at all, as with infinite regress, or be a circular argument, justified only by itself and have no solid foundation, much like the absurdity of Münchhausen pulling himself out of the mire without any independent support. In contemporary epistemology, advocates of coherentism are supposed to accept the "circular" horn of the trilemma; foundationalists rely on the dogmatic argument. The view that accepts infinite regress is called infinitism.

It is also known as Agrippa's trilemma or the Agrippan trilemma after a similar argument reported by Sextus Empiricus, which was attributed to Agrippa the Skeptic by Diogenes Laërtius. Sextus's argument, however, consists of five (not three) "modes".

== Fries's trilemma ==
Karl Popper, in Logic of Scientific Discovery, mentions neither Sextus nor Agrippa but instead attributes his trilemma to German philosopher Jakob Friedrich Fries, leading some to call it Fries's trilemma as a result.

Jakob Friedrich Fries formulated a similar trilemma in which statements can be accepted either:

- dogmatically
- supported by infinite regress
- based on perceptual experience (psychologism)

The first two possibilities are rejected by Fries as unsatisfactory, requiring his adopting the third option. Popper argued that a way to avoid the trilemma was to use an intermediate approach incorporating some dogmatism, some infinite regress, and some perceptual experience.

== Albert's formulation ==
The argument proposed by Hans Albert runs as follows: All of the only three possible attempts to get a certain justification must fail:

- All justifications in pursuit of "certain" knowledge must also justify the means of their justification, and doing so will require them to justify anew the means of their justification. Therefore, there can be no end, only the hopeless situation of infinite regression.
- A circular argument can be used to justify its mock impression of validity and soundness, but this sacrifices its usefulness (as the conclusion and premise are one and the same, no advancement in knowledge has taken place).
- One can stop at self-evidence or common sense or fundamental principles or speaking ex cathedra or at any other evidence, but in doing so, the intention to install "certain" justification is abandoned.

An English translation of a quote from the original German text by Albert is as follows:

Here, one has a mere choice between:

1. An infinite regression, which appears because of the necessity to go ever further back, but is not practically feasible and does not, therefore, provide a certain foundation.
2. A logical circle in the deduction, which is caused by the fact that one, in the need to found, falls back on statements which had already appeared before as requiring a foundation, and which circle does not lead to any certain foundation either.
3. A break of searching at a certain point, which indeed appears principally feasible, but would mean a random suspension of the principle of sufficient reason.

Albert stressed repeatedly that there is no limitation of the Münchhausen trilemma to deductive conclusions. The verdict concerns also inductive, causal, transcendental, and all otherwise structured justifications. They all will be in vain.

Therefore, certain justification is impossible to attain. Once having given up the classical idea of certain knowledge, one can stop the process of justification where one wants to stop, presupposed one is ready to start critical thinking at this point, always anew if necessary.

This trilemma rounds off the classical problem of justification in the theory of knowledge.

The failure to prove exactly any truth, as expressed by the Münchhausen trilemma, does not have to lead to the dismissal of objectivity, as with relativism. One example of an alternative is the fallibilism of Karl Popper and Hans Albert, accepting that certainty is impossible but that it is best to get as close as possible to truth while remembering our uncertainty.

In Albert's view, the impossibility of proving any certain truth is not in itself a certain truth. After all, one needs to assume some basic rules of logical inference to derive his result, and in doing so, must either abandon the pursuit of "certain" justification, as above, or attempt to justify these rules, etc. He suggests that it has to be taken as true as long as nobody has come forward with a truth that is scrupulously justified as a certain truth. Several philosophers defied Albert's challenge; his responses to such criticisms can be found in his long addendum to his Treatise on Critical Reason and later articles.

== See also ==
- Anti-foundationalism – Epistemology without sure premises
- Cognitive closure (philosophy) – Inherent limitations of the human mind
- Critical rationalism – Epistemological philosophy advanced by Karl Popper
- Duhem–Quine thesis – Principle in the philosophy of science
- Foundherentism – Theory of justification in epistemology
- Gödel's incompleteness theorems – Limitative results in mathematical logic
- Nihilism – Rejection of certain ideas about reality
- Problem of the criterion – Philosophical problem about the starting point of knowledge
- Rational fideism – Philosophical view on faith and reason
- Infinite regress (epistemology) – Problem in epistemology that any proposition can be endlessly questioned
- Theory of justification – Concept in epistemology
- "What the Tortoise Said to Achilles" – 1895 allegorical dialogue by Lewis Carroll
