= Reflective equilibrium =

State of balance among a set of beliefs, arrived at by considering general principles

Reflective equilibrium is a state of balance or coherence among a set of beliefs arrived at by a process of deliberative mutual adjustment among general principles and particular judgements. Although he did not use the term, philosopher Nelson Goodman introduced the method of reflective equilibrium as an approach to justifying the principles of inductive logic (this is now known as Goodman's method). The term reflective equilibrium was coined by John Rawls and popularized in his A Theory of Justice as a method for arriving at the content of the principles of justice.

Dietmar Hübner has pointed out that there are many interpretations of reflective equilibrium that deviate from Rawls' method in ways that reduce the cogency of the idea. Among these misinterpretations, according to Hübner, are definitions of reflective equilibrium as "(a) balancing theoretical accounts against intuitive convictions; (b) balancing general principles against particular judgements; (c) balancing opposite ethical conceptions or divergent moral statements".

== Overview ==
Rawls argues that human beings have a "sense of justice" that is a source of both moral judgment and moral motivation. In Rawls's theory, we begin with "considered judgments" that arise from the sense of justice. These may be judgments about general moral principles (of any level of generality) or specific moral cases. If our judgments conflict in some way, we proceed by adjusting our various beliefs until they are in "equilibrium", which is to say that they are stable, not in conflict, and provide consistent practical guidance. Rawls argues that a set of moral beliefs in ideal reflective equilibrium describes or characterizes the underlying principles of the human sense of justice.

For example, suppose that Zachary believes in the general principle of always obeying the commands in the Bible. Suppose also that he thinks that it is not ethical to stone people to death merely for being Wiccan. These views may come into conflict (see Exodus 22:18 versus John 8:7). If they do, Zachary will then have several choices. He can discard his general principle in search of a better one, such as obeying only the Ten Commandments; or modify his general principle by choosing a different translation of the Bible, or letting Jesus' teaching from John 8:7 "If any of you is without sin, let him be the first to cast a stone", override the Old Testament command; or change his opinions about the point in question to conform with his theory, by deciding that witches really should be killed. Whatever the decision, he has moved toward reflective equilibrium.

== Use in Rawls's political theory ==
Reflective equilibrium serves an important justificatory function within Rawls's political theory. The nature of this function, however, is disputed. The dominant view, best exemplified by the work of Norman Daniels and Thomas Scanlon, is that the method of reflective equilibrium is a kind of coherentist method for the epistemic justification of moral beliefs. However, in other writings, Rawls seems to argue that his theory bypasses traditional metaethical questions, including questions of moral epistemology, and is intended instead to serve a practical function. This provides some motivation for a different view of the justificatory role of reflective equilibrium. On this view, the method of reflective equilibrium serves its justificatory function by linking together the cognitive and motivational aspects of the human sense of justice in the appropriate way.

Rawls argues that candidate principles of justice cannot be justified unless they are shown to be stable. Principles of justice are stable if, among other things, the members of society regard them as authoritative and reliably comply with them. The method of reflective equilibrium determines a set of principles rooted in the human sense of justice, which is a capacity that both provides the material for the process of reflective equilibration and our motivation to adhere to principles we judge morally sound. The method of reflective equilibrium serves the aim of defining a realistic and stable social order by determining a practically coherent set of principles that are grounded in the right way in the source of our moral motivation, such that we will be disposed to comply with them. As Fred D'Agostino puts it, stable principles of justice will require considerable "up-take" by the members of society. The method of reflective equilibrium provides a way of settling on principles that will achieve the kind of "up-take" necessary for stability.

Reflective equilibrium is not static, though Rawls allows for provisional fixed points; it will change as the individual considers his opinions about individual issues or explores the consequences of his principles.

Rawls applied this technique to his conception of a hypothetical original position from which people would agree to a social contract. He arrived at the conclusion that the optimal theory of justice is the one to which people would agree from behind a veil of ignorance, not knowing their social positions.

== Wide reflective equilibrium ==
Wide reflective equilibrium, first introduced by Rawls, has been described by Norman Daniels as "a method that attempts to produce coherence in ordered triple sets of beliefs held by a particular person, namely: (a) a set of considered moral judgments, (b) a set of moral principles, and (c) a set of relevant (scientific and philosophical) background theories".

== Relation to constructivism ==
Kai Nielsen has asserted that "philosophers who are defenders of reflective equilibrium are also constructivists", in response to what he considered to be the misconception that reflective equilibrium works with some necessarily preexisting coherent system of moral beliefs and practices:

The pattern of consistent beliefs, including very centrally moral beliefs, is not a structure to be discovered or unearthed, as if it were analogous to the deep underlying "depth grammar" of language (if indeed there is any such a thing), but something to be forged—constructed—by a careful and resolute use of the method of reflective equilibrium. We start from our considered judgments (convictions), however culturally and historically skewed. This involves—indeed, inescapably involves—seeing things by our own lights. Where else could we start? We can hardly jump out of our cultural and historical skins.

== Criticism ==
Paul Thagard has criticized the method of reflective equilibrium as "only like a smokescreen for a relatively sophisticated form of logical and methodological relativism" and "at best incidental to the process of developing normative principles". Among the "numerous problems" of reflective equilibrium, Thagard counted "undue reliance on intuition and the danger of arriving at stable but suboptimal sets of norms". In place of reflective equilibrium, Thagard recommended what he considered to be a more consequentialist method of justifying norms by identifying a domain of practices, identifying candidate norms for the practices, identifying the appropriate goals of the practices, evaluating the extent to which different practices accomplish these goals, and adopting as domain norms the practices that best accomplish these goals.

== See also ==
- Belief revision
- Consistency
- Dialectics
- Double-loop learning
- Enantiodromia
- Foundherentism
- Neurath's boat
- Rational reconstruction
- Reason maintenance
