= Peter D. Klein =

American philosopher (born 1940)

- Born: Peter David Klein; September 17, 1940 (age 86); Cincinnati, Ohio, U.S.

Education
- Education: Earlham College (BA); Yale University (MA, PhD)
- Academic advisor: Rulon S. Wells III

Philosophical work
- Era: Contemporary philosophy
- Region: Western philosophy
- School: Analytic philosophy
- Institutions: Colgate University, Rutgers University
- Main interests: Epistemology
- Notable ideas: Infinitism, defeasibility theory of knowledge

Peter David Klein (born September 17, 1940) is an American philosopher specializing in issues in epistemology who spent most of his career at Rutgers University.

== Education and career ==
He received a BA at Earlham College (1962) and an MA (1964) and PhD from Yale University (1966).

He taught at Colgate University as an assistant professor from 1966 to 1970. Following that, he moved to Rutgers University, where he taught as an assistant professor from 1970 to 1973, an associate professor from 1973 to 1981, and a full professor from 1981 until retiring from Rutgers in 2016.

== Philosophical work ==
Klein is widely known for his work on skepticism. His most influential work, however, is on the nature of knowledge, where he has long defended the defeasibility theory of knowledge. His recent work defends infinitism about justification. On this view, to be justified in believing P is to possess a reason R1 to believe P, and a reason R2 to believe R1, and a reason R3.....and so on, ad infinitum. Justification is, so to speak, "turtles all the way down." He has also recently advocated a picture of knowledge according to which one can have knowledge of p even if the justification for the belief of p is essentially based on false premises. Klein calls these "useful falsehoods".

Klein authored one book: Certainty: A Refutation of Skepticism (1982) (University of Minnesota Press), and co-edited Ad Infinitum: New Essays on Epistemological Infinitism (Oxford University Press) with John Turri. He has published a number of articles, chapters, and reviews in epistemology.

== See also ==
- American philosophy
- List of American philosophers
