= Aenesidemus =

1st century BC Greek Pyrrhonist philosopher

- Born: c. 1st century BC; Knossos

Philosophical work
- Era: Hellenistic philosophy
- Region: Western philosophy
- School: Pyrrhonism
- Main interests: Skepticism
- Notable ideas: The ten modes of Aenesidemus

Aenesidemus (Ancient Greek: Αἰνησίδημος or Αἰνεσίδημος) was a 1st-century BC Greek Pyrrhonist philosopher from Knossos who revived the doctrines of Pyrrho and introduced ten skeptical "modes" (tropai) for the suspension of judgment. He broke with the Academic Skepticism that was predominant in his time, synthesizing the teachings of Heraclitus and Timon of Phlius with philosophical skepticism. Although his primary work, the Pyrrhonian Discourses, has been lost, an outline of the work survives from the later Byzantine Empire, and the description of the modes has been preserved by a few ancient sources.

== Life ==
There is no definitive evidence about the life of Aenesidemus. What little we know is from a description of his Pyrrhonian Discourses in the Myriobiblion of Photius from the 9th century, as well as a few mentions in the works of Sextus Empiricus, and to a lesser extent by Diogenes Laërtius.

Whether Aenesidemus re-founded the Pyrrhonist school or merely revitalized it is unknown: while Diogenes claims an unbroken lineage of teachers of Pyrrhonism from Pyrrho through Sextus, with Aenesidemus' teacher being Heraclides of Tarentum, little is known about several of the names between Timon of Phlius and Aenesidemus, so this lineage is suspect. Photius says that Aenesidemus dedicated his Pyrrhonian Discourses to Lucius Aelius Tubero, a friend of Cicero and member of the academy, whom Photius described as a colleague of Aenesidemus. Based on this information, scholars have assumed that Aenesidemus himself was also a member of the academy. Furthermore, it has been assumed that he took part under the leadership of Philo of Larissa and probably adopted Pyrrhonism either in reaction to Antiochus of Ascalon's Middle Platonist introduction of Stoic and Peripatetic dogma into the Academy, or Philo's acceptance of provisional beliefs.

== Philosophy ==
Aenesidemus' philosophy consisted of four main parts, the reasons for scepticism and doubt, the attack on causality and truth, a physical theory, and a theory of morality. Having disposed of the ideas of truth and causality, he undermines the ethical criterion, and denies that anyone can aim at Good, Pleasure or Happiness as an absolute, concrete ideal, but that all actions are product of pleasure and pain, good and evil.

=== The ten modes of Aenesidemus ===
The reasons for doubt are given in the form of the ten "tropes" (also known as ten modes of Aenesidemus or ten tropes of Aenesidemus) that represent reasons for epoché (suspension of judgment). :

- (1) different animals manifest different impressions;
- (2) similar differences are seen among individual people;
- (3) even for the same person, sense-given data are self-contradictory,
- (4) sense data vary from time to time with physical changes, and
- (5) sense-data vary according to local relations;
- (6) and (7) objects are known only indirectly through the medium of air, moisture, &c., and are in a condition of perpetual change in colour, temperature, size and motion;
- (8) all perceptions are relative and interact one upon another;
- (9) Our impressions become less deep by repetition and custom; and
- (10) all people are brought up with different beliefs, under different laws and social conditions.

Aenesidemus argues that truth varies infinitely under circumstances whose relative weight cannot be accurately gauged. There is, therefore, no absolute knowledge, for everyone has different perceptions, and, further, arranges and groups data in methods peculiar to themselves; so that the sum total is a quantity with a purely subjective validity.

=== Attack on causality ===
The second part of his work consists in the attack upon the theory of causality, in which he adduces almost entirely those considerations which are the basis of modern scepticism. Cause has no existence apart from the mind which perceives; its validity is ideal, or, as Kant would have said, subjective. The relation between cause and effect is unthinkable. If the two things are different, they are either simultaneous or in succession. If simultaneous, cause is effect and effect cause. If not, since effect cannot precede cause, cause must precede effect, and there must be an instant when cause is not effective, that is, is not itself. By these and similar arguments he arrives at the fundamental principle of Scepticism, the radical and universal opposition of causes; παντὶ λόγῳ λόγος ἀντίκειται.

=== Heraclitean view ===
According to Sextus Empiricus, Aenesidemus either assimilated the theories of Heraclitus, or gave an account of them, stating that Aenesidemus was able to assert the co-existence of contrary qualities in the same object by admitting that contraries co-exist for the perceiving subject. John Burnet discusses the question of Sextus Empiricus' ambiguous reproduction of Aenesidemus account of the theories of Heraclitus:

"Sextus quotes "Ainesidemos according to Herakleitos." Natorp holds (Forschungen, p. 78) that Ainesidemos really did combine Herakleiteanism with Scepticism. Diels (Dox. pp. 210, 211), insists that he only gave an account of the theories of Herakleitos. The locus classicus on this is a passage of Sextus Empiricus, which reproduces the account given by Ainesidemos. It is as follows (Ritter and Preller (1898) Historia Philosophiae Graecae section 41):

"The natural philosopher is of opinion that what surrounds us is rational and endowed with consciousness. According to Herakleitos, when we draw in this divine reason by means of respiration, we become rational. In sleep we forget, but at our waking we become conscious once more. For in sleep, when the openings of the senses close, the mind which is in us is cut off from contact with that which surrounds us, and only our connexion with it by means of respiration is preserved as a sort of root (from which the rest may spring again); and, when it is thus separated, it loses the power of memory that it had before. When we awake again, however, it looks out through the openings of the senses, as if through windows, and coming together with the surrounding mind, it assumes the power of reason. Just, then, as embers, when they are brought near the fire, change and become red-hot, and go out when they are taken away from it again, so does the portion of the surrounding mind which sojourns in our body become irrational when it is cut off, and so does it become of like nature to the whole when contact is established through the greatest number of openings."

In this passage there is clearly a large admixture of later ideas. In particular, the identification of "that which surrounds us" with the air cannot be Herakleitean; for Herakleitos knew nothing of air except as a form of water (§ 27). The reference to the pores or openings of the senses is probably foreign to him also; for the theory of pores is due to Alkmaion (§ 96). Lastly, the distinction between mind and body is far too sharply drawn. On the other hand, the important role assigned to respiration may very well be Herakleitean; for we have met with it already in Anaximenes. And we can hardly doubt that the striking simile of the embers which glow when brought near the fire is genuine (cf. fr. 77). The true doctrine doubtless was, that sleep was produced by the encroachment of moist, dark exhalations from the water in the body, which cause the fire to burn low. In sleep, we lose contact with the fire in the world which is common to all, and retire to a world of our own (fr. 95). In a soul where the fire and water are evenly balanced, the equilibrium is restored in the morning by an equal advance of the bright exhalation."

== Pyrrhonian Discourses ==
His chief work, the Pyrrhonian Discourses (Ancient Greek: Πυρρώνειοι λóγοι, romanized: Pyrrhoneioi logoi) dealt primarily with man's need to suspend judgment due to our epistemological limitations. Although it has not survived, we have a summary of its contents from Photius (in his Myriobiblion). The work, which was divided into eight books, detailed Pyrrhonist philosophy, described the differences between the Pyrrhonists and the Academic Skeptics, and set out ten "tropes", or "modes" for producing suspension of judgment.

== Legacy ==
Philo of Alexandria outlined the modes in his work "On Drunkenness."

In the 18th century, Gottlob Ernst Schulze wrote a book named after Aenesidemus in which he criticizes the defense of Immanuel Kant's Critique of Pure Reason made by Karl Leonhard Reinhold. The book is a fictionalized dialogue between Aenesidemus and "Hermias", an adherent of Kantianism.

== See also ==
- Agrippa the Sceptic
- Arcesilaus
- Carneades
- Pyrrho
