= Chicken or the egg =

Causality dilemma

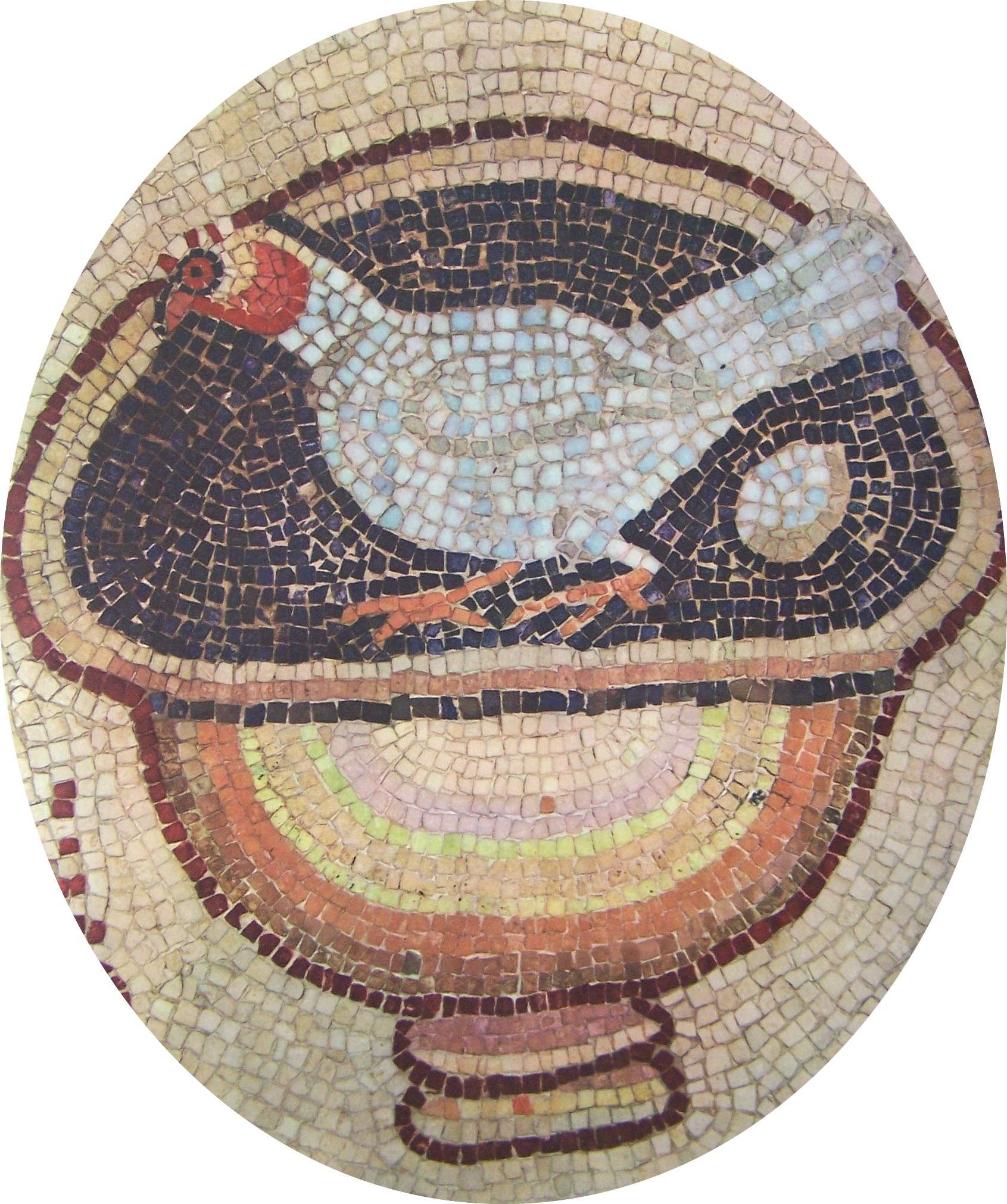
6th century mosaic of a chicken and an egg

The chicken or the egg causality dilemma is commonly stated as the question, "which came first: the chicken or the egg?" The dilemma stems from the observation that all chickens hatch from eggs and all chicken eggs are laid by chickens. "Chicken-and-egg" is a metaphoric adjective describing situations where it is not clear which of two events should be considered the cause and which should be considered the effect, to express a scenario of infinite regress, or to express the difficulty of sequencing actions where each seems to depend on others being done first. Plutarch posed the question as a philosophical matter in his essay "The Symposiacs", written in the 1st century CE.

== Ancient legacy ==
The question represents an ancient folk paradox addressing the problem of origins and first cause. Aristotle, writing in the fourth century BCE, concluded that this was an infinite sequence, with no true origin. Plutarch, writing four centuries later, specifically highlighted this question as bearing on a "great and weighty problem (whether the world had a beginning)". In the fifth century CE, Macrobius wrote that while the question seemed trivial, it "should be regarded as one of importance".

By the end of the 16th century, the well-known question seemed to have been regarded as settled in the Christian world, based on the origin story of the Bible. In describing the creation of animals, it allows for a first chicken that did not come from an egg. However, later Enlightenment philosophers began to question this solution. Carlo Dati in the mid-17th century published an erudite satire on the subject.

== Scientific resolutions ==
Although the question is typically used metaphorically, evolutionary biology provides literal answers, made possible by the Darwinian principle that species evolve over time, and thus that chickens had ancestors that were not chickens, similar to a view expressed by the Greek philosopher Anaximander when addressing the paradox.

If the question refers to eggs in general, the egg came first. The first amniote egg – that is, a hard-shelled egg that could be laid on land, rather than remaining in water like the eggs of fish or amphibians – appeared around 312 million years ago. In contrast, chickens are domesticated descendants of red junglefowl and probably arose little more than eight thousand years ago, at most.

If the question refers to chicken eggs specifically, the answer is still the egg, but the explanation is more complicated. The process by which the chicken arose through the interbreeding and domestication of multiple species of wild jungle fowl is poorly understood, and the point at which this evolving organism became a chicken is a somewhat arbitrary distinction. Whatever criteria one chooses, an animal nearly identical to the modern chicken (i.e., a proto-chicken) laid a fertilized egg that had DNA making it a modern chicken due to mutations in the mother's ovum, the father's sperm, or the fertilised zygote.

It has been suggested that the actions of a protein found in modern chicken eggs may make the answer different. In the uterus, chickens produce ovocleidin-17 (OC-17), which causes the formation of the thickened calcium carbonate shell around their eggs. Since OC-17 is expressed by the hen, not the egg, the first bird with this protein would have hatched from a non-reinforced egg. That bird would then lay the first reinforced egg; therefore, the chicken came before the first "modern" chicken egg. However, the presence of OC-17 or a homolog in other species, such as turkeys and finches suggests that such eggshell-reinforcing proteins are common to all birds, and thus long predate the first chickens.

== See also ==
- Bootstrapping (compilers), the solution to an analogous problem in computer science
- Catch-22
- Sorites paradox
