= Ringschluss =

Proof strategy for showing a collection of statements are equivalent

In mathematics, a Ringschluss (German: Beweis durch Ringschluss, lit. 'Proof by ring-inference') is a mathematical proof technique where the equivalence of several statements can be proven without having to prove all pairwise equivalences directly. In English it is also sometimes called a cycle of implications, closed chain inference, or circular implication; however, it should be distinguished from circular reasoning, a logical fallacy.

In order to prove that the statements $\varphi_1,\ldots,\varphi_n$ are each pairwise equivalent, proofs are given for the implications $\varphi_1\Rightarrow\varphi_2$, $\varphi_2\Rightarrow\varphi_3$, $\dots$, $\varphi_{n-1}\Rightarrow\varphi_n$ and $\varphi_{n}\Rightarrow\varphi_1$.

The pairwise equivalence of the statements then results from the transitivity of the material conditional.

== Example ==
For $n=4$ the proofs are given for $\varphi_1\Rightarrow\varphi_2$, $\varphi_2\Rightarrow\varphi_3$, $\varphi_3\Rightarrow\varphi_4$ and $\varphi_4\Rightarrow\varphi_1$. The equivalence of $\varphi_2$ and $\varphi_4$ results from the chain of conclusions that are no longer explicitly given:

$\varphi_2 \Rightarrow \varphi_3$. $\varphi_3 \Rightarrow \varphi_4$. This leads to: $\varphi_2 \Rightarrow \varphi_4$
$\varphi_4 \Rightarrow \varphi_1$. $\varphi_1 \Rightarrow \varphi_2$. This leads to: $\varphi_4 \Rightarrow \varphi_2$

That is $\varphi_2\Leftrightarrow \varphi_4$.

== Motivation ==
The technique saves writing effort above all. In proving the equivalence of $n$ statements, it requires the direct proof of only $n$ out of the $n(n-1)/2$ implications between these statements. In contrast, for instance, choosing one of the statements as being central and proving that the remaining $n-1$ statements are each equivalent to the central one would require $2(n-1)$ implications, a larger number. The difficulty for the mathematician is to find a sequence of statements that allows for the most elegant direct proofs possible.
