= Foundherentism =

Theory of justification in epistemology

In epistemology, foundherentism is a theory of justification that combines elements from two rival theories about infinite regress—foundationalism and coherentism—while addressing their respective problems of arbitrariness and circularity (problems raised by the Münchhausen trilemma). It was developed and defended by Susan Haack in her 1993 work Evidence and Inquiry: Towards Reconstruction in Epistemology.

== Overview ==
In principle, foundationalism holds that basic beliefs unilaterally support derived beliefs, with support always directed from the former to the latter; coherentism holds that beliefs mutually support each other when they belong to the same coherent belief-set. As these theories were refined, however, some foundationalists began to admit that even basic beliefs could be fallible, and that derived beliefs could mutually support each other; whereas some coherentists began to admit that experiential beliefs should be weighted so as to reflect realistic degrees of coherence or justification. So the rival theories began to lean closer together. Moreover, those foundationalists who wondered why there could not be mutual support between basic and derived beliefs were in danger of falling into coherentism. Those coherentists who wondered why experiential beliefs should be weighted more heavily than others were also falling into foundationalism.

Haack argues that foundationalism and coherentism do not exhaust the field, and that an intermediate theory is more plausible than either. It is possible to include the relevance of experience for the justification of empirical beliefs, as experientialist foundationalism does but coherentism does not, and at the same time, instead of requiring a privileged class of basic beliefs, to allow for pervasive mutual dependence among beliefs, as coherentism does but foundationalism does not. These are the key ideas of foundherentism. Precursors to Haack's view include Bertrand Russell's epistemology, in which both empirical foundations and coherence are components of justification.

Haack introduces the analogy of the crossword puzzle to serve as a way of understanding how there can be mutual support among beliefs (as there is mutual support among crossword entries) without vicious circularity. The analogy between the structure of evidence and the crossword puzzle helps with another problem too. The clues to a crossword are the analogue of a person's experiential evidence, and the already-completed intersecting entries are the analogue of their reasons for a belief. She claims that her metaphor has proven particularly fruitful in her own work, and has been found useful by many readers, not only philosophers but also scientists, economists, legal scholars, etc.

== See also ==
- Consistency
- Dialectics
- Double-loop learning
- Enantiodromia
- Reflective equilibrium
- Rational reconstruction
