= Pyrrhonism =

Ancient Greek school of philosophical skepticism

Pyrrhonism is an Ancient Greek school of philosophical skepticism which rejects dogma and advocates the suspension of judgment over the truth of all beliefs. It was founded by Aenesidemus in the first century BCE, and said to have been inspired by the teachings of Pyrrho and Timon of Phlius in the fourth century BCE.

Pyrrhonism is best known today through the surviving works of Sextus Empiricus, writing in the late second century or early third century CE. The publication of Sextus' works in the Renaissance ignited a revival of interest in Skepticism and played a major role in Reformation thought and the development of early modern philosophy.

== History ==
Pyrrhonism is named after Pyrrho of Elis, a Greek philosopher in the 4th century BCE who was credited by the later Pyrrhonists with forming the first comprehensive school of skeptical thought. However, ancient testimony about the philosophical beliefs of the historical Pyrrho is minimal, and often contradictory: his teachings were recorded by his student Timon of Phlius, but those works have been lost, and only survive in fragments quoted by later authors, and based on testimonies of later authors such as Cicero. Pyrrho's own philosophy as recorded by Timon may have been much more dogmatic than that of the later school who bore his name. While Pyrrhonism would become the dominant form of skepticism in the early Roman period, in the Hellenistic period, the Platonic Academy was the primary advocate of skepticism until the mid-first century BCE, when Pyrrhonism as a philosophical school was founded by Aenesidemus.

== Philosophy ==
The goal of Pyrrhonism is ataraxia, an untroubled and tranquil condition of soul that results from a suspension of judgement, a mental rest owing to which we neither deny nor affirm anything.

Pyrrhonists dispute that the dogmatists – which includes all of Pyrrhonism's rival philosophies – claim to have found truth regarding non-evident matters, and that these opinions about non-evident matters (i.e., dogma) are what prevent one from attaining eudaimonia. For any of these dogmas, a Pyrrhonist makes arguments for and against such that the matter cannot be concluded, thus suspending judgement, and thereby inducing ataraxia.

Pyrrhonists can be subdivided into those who are ephectic (engaged in suspension of judgment), aporetic (engaged in refutation) or zetetic (engaged in seeking). An ephectic merely suspends judgment on a matter, "balancing perceptions and thoughts against one another." It is a less aggressive form of skepticism, in that sometimes "suspension of judgment evidently just happens to the sceptic". An aporetic skeptic, in contrast, works more actively towards their goal, engaging in the refutation of arguments in favor of various possible beliefs in order to reach aporia, an impasse, or state of perplexity, which leads to suspension of judgement. Finally, the zetetic claims to be continually searching for the truth but to have thus far been unable to find it, and thus continues to suspend belief while also searching for reason to cease the suspension of belief.

=== Modes ===
Although Pyrrhonism's objective is ataraxia, it is best known for its epistemological arguments. The core practice is through setting argument against argument. To aid in this, the Pyrrhonist philosophers Aenesidemus and Agrippa developed sets of stock arguments known as "modes" or "tropes."

==== The ten modes of Aenesidemus ====
Aenesidemus is considered the creator of the ten tropes of Aenesidemus (also known as the ten modes of Aenesidemus)—although whether he invented the tropes or just systematized them from prior Pyrrhonist works is unknown. The tropes represent reasons for suspension of judgment. These are as follows:

1. Different animals manifest different modes of perception;
2. Similar differences are seen among individual men;
3. For the same man, information perceived with the senses is self-contradictory
4. Furthermore, it varies from time to time with physical changes
5. In addition, this data differs according to local relations
6. Objects are known only indirectly through the medium of air, moisture, etc.
7. These objects are in a condition of perpetual change in colour, temperature, size and motion
8. All perceptions are relative and interact one upon another
9. Our impressions become less critical through repetition and custom
10. All men are brought up with different beliefs, under different laws and social conditions

According to Sextus, superordinate to these ten modes stand three other modes: that based on the subject who judges (modes 1, 2, 3 & 4), that based on the object judged (modes 7 & 10), that based on both subject who judges and object judged (modes 5, 6, 8 & 9), and superordinate to these three modes is the mode of relation.

==== The five modes of Agrippa ====
These "tropes" or "modes" are given by Sextus Empiricus in his Outlines of Pyrrhonism. According to Sextus, they are attributed only "to the more recent skeptics" and it is by Diogenes Laërtius that we attribute them to Agrippa. The five tropes of Agrippa are:

1. Dissent – The uncertainty demonstrated by the differences of opinions among philosophers and people in general (dispute).
2. Infinite regress – All proof rests on matters themselves in need of proof, and so on to infinity.
3. Relation – All things are changed as their relations become changed, or, as we look upon them from different points of view (relativity).
4. Assumption – The truth asserted is based on an unsupported assumption (hypothesis).
5. Circularity – The truth asserted involves a circularity of proofs (reciprocal mode).

According to the mode deriving from dispute, we find that undecidable dissension about the matter proposed has come about both in ordinary life and among philosophers. Because of this we are not able to choose or to rule out anything, and we end up with suspension of judgement. In the mode deriving from infinite regress, we say that what is brought forward as a source of conviction for the matter proposed itself needs another such source, which itself needs another, and so ad infinitum, so that we have no point from which to begin to establish anything, and suspension of judgement follows. In the mode deriving from relativity, as we said above, the existing object appears to be such-and-such relative to the subject judging and to the things observed together with it, but we suspend judgement on what it is like in its nature. We have the mode from hypothesis when the Dogmatists, being thrown back ad infinitum, begin from something which they do not establish but claim to assume simply and without proof in virtue of a concession. The reciprocal mode occurs when what ought to be confirmatory of the object under investigation needs to be made convincing by the object under investigation; then, being unable to take either in order to establish the other, we suspend judgement about both.

With reference to these five tropes, that the first and third are a short summary of the earlier Ten Modes of Aenesidemus. The three additional ones show a progress in the Pyrrhonist system, building upon the objections derived from the fallibility of sense and opinion to more abstract and metaphysical grounds. According to Victor Brochard "the five tropes can be regarded as the most radical and most precise formulation of skepticism that has ever been given. In a sense, they are still irresistible today."

=== Criteria of action ===
Pyrrhonist decision making is made according to what the Pyrrhonists describe as the criteria of action holding to the appearances, without beliefs in accord with the ordinary regimen of life based on:

1. the guidance of nature, by which we are naturally capable of sensation and thought
2. the compulsion of the passions by which hunger drives us to food and thirst makes us drink
3. the handing down of customs and laws by which we accept that piety in the conduct of life is good and impiety bad
4. instruction in techne

=== Skeptic sayings ===
The Pyrrhonists devised several sayings (Greek ΦΩΝΩΝ) to help practitioners bring their minds to suspend judgment. Among these are:

- Not more, nothing more (a saying attributed to Democritus)
- Non-assertion (aphasia)
- Perhaps, it is possible, maybe
- I withhold assent
- I determine nothing (Montaigne created a variant of this as his own personal motto, "Que sais-je?" – "what do I know?")
- Everything is indeterminate
- Everything is non-apprehensible
- I do not apprehend
- To every argument an equal argument is opposed

== Texts ==
Except for the works of Sextus Empiricus, the texts of ancient Pyrrhonism have been lost. There is a summary of the Pyrrhonian Discourses by Aenesidemus, preserved by Photius, and a brief summary of Pyrrho's teaching by Aristocles, quoting Pyrrho's student Timon preserved by Eusebius:

'The things themselves are equally indifferent, and unstable, and indeterminate, and therefore neither our senses nor our opinions are either true or false. For this reason then we must not trust them, but be without opinions, and without bias, and without wavering, saying of every single thing that it no more is than is not, or both is and is not, or neither is nor is not.

== Influence ==
=== In Ancient Greek philosophy ===
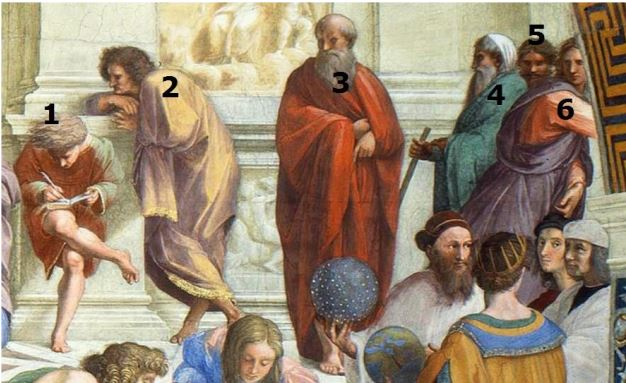
Skeptics in Raphael's School of Athens painting. Pyrrho is #4 and Timon #5.

Pyrrhonism is often contrasted with Academic skepticism, a similar but distinct form of Hellenistic philosophical skepticism. While early Academic skepticism was influenced in part by Pyrrho, it grew more and more dogmatic until Aenesidemus broke with the Academics to revive Pyrrhonism in the first century BCE, denouncing the Academy as "Stoics fighting against Stoics. Some later Pyrrhonists, such as Sextus Empiricus, go so far as to claim that Pyrrhonists are the only real skeptics, dividing all philosophy into the dogmatists, the Academics, and the skeptics. Dogmatists claim to have knowledge, Academic skeptics claim that knowledge is impossible, while Pyrrhonists assent to neither proposition, suspending judgment on both. The second century Roman historian Aulus Gellius describes the distinction as "...the Academics apprehend (in some sense) the very fact that nothing can be apprehended, and they determine (in some sense) that nothing can be determined, whereas the Pyrrhonists assert that not even that seems to be true, since nothing seems to be true."

Sextus Empiricus also said that the Pyrrhonist school influenced and had substantial overlap with the Empiric school of medicine, but that Pyrrhonism had more in common with the Methodic school in that it "follow[s] the appearances and take[s] from these whatever seems expedient."

Although Julian the Philosopher mentions that Pyrrhonism had died out at the time of his writings, other writers mention the existence of later Pyrrhonists. Pseudo-Clement, writing around the same time (c. 300–320 CE) mentions Pyrrhonists in his Homilies and Agathias even reports a Pyrrhonist named Uranius as late as the middle of the 6th century CE.

=== Similarities between Pyrrhonism and Indian philosophy ===
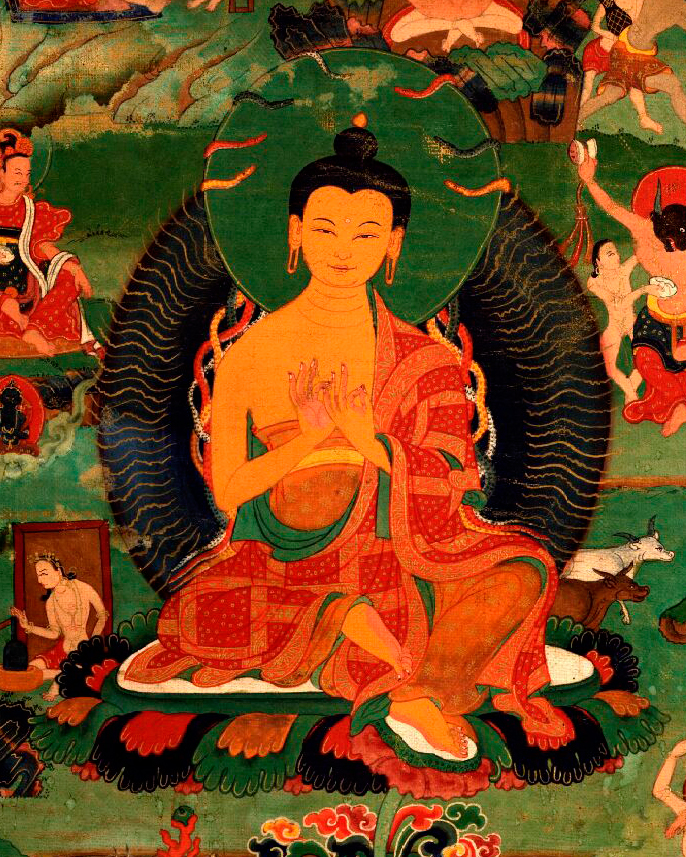
Nagarjuna, a Madhyamaka Buddhist philosopher whose skeptical arguments are similar to those preserved in the work of Sextus Empiricus

A number of similarities have been noted between the Pyrrhonist works of Sextus Empiricius and that of Nagarjuna, the Madhyamaka Buddhist philosopher from the 2nd or 3rd century CE. Buddhist philosopher Jan Westerhoff says "many of Nāgārjuna's arguments concerning causation bear strong similarities to classical sceptical arguments as presented in the third book of Sextus Empiricus's Outlines of Pyrrhonism," and Thomas McEvilley suspects that Nagarjuna may have been influenced by Greek Pyrrhonist texts imported into India. McEvilley argues for mutual iteration in the Buddhist logico-epistemological traditions between Pyrrhonism and Madhyamika:

An extraordinary similarity, that has long been noticed, between Pyrrhonism and Mādhyamaka is the formula known in connection with Buddhism as the fourfold negation (Catuṣkoṭi) and which in Pyrrhonic form might be called the fourfold indeterminacy.

McEvilley also notes a correspondence between the Pyrrhonist and Madhyamaka views about truth, comparing Sextus' account of two criteria regarding truth, one which judges between reality and unreality, and another which we use as a guide in everyday life. By the first criteria, nothing is either true or false, but by the second, information from the senses may be considered either true or false for practical purposes. As Edward Conze has noted, this is similar to the Madhyamika Two Truths doctrine, a distinction between "Absolute truth" (paramārthasatya), "the knowledge of the real as it is without any distortion," and "Truth so-called" (saṃvṛti satya), "truth as conventionally believed in common parlance.

Other similarities between Pyrrhonism and Buddhism include a version of the tetralemma among the Pyrrhonist maxims, and more significantly, the idea of suspension of judgement and how that can lead to peace and liberation; ataraxia in Pyrrhonism and nirvāṇa in Buddhism.

Some scholars have also looked farther back, to determine if any earlier Indian philosophy have had an influence on Pyrrho. Diogenes Laërtius' biography of Pyrrho reports that Pyrrho traveled with Alexander the Great's army to India and incorporated what he learned from the Gymnosophists and the Magi that he met in his travels into his philosophical system. Pyrrho would have spent about 18 months in Taxila as part of Alexander the Great's court during Alexander's conquest of the east. Christopher I. Beckwith draws comparisons between the Buddhist three marks of existence and the concepts outlined in the "Aristocles Passage".

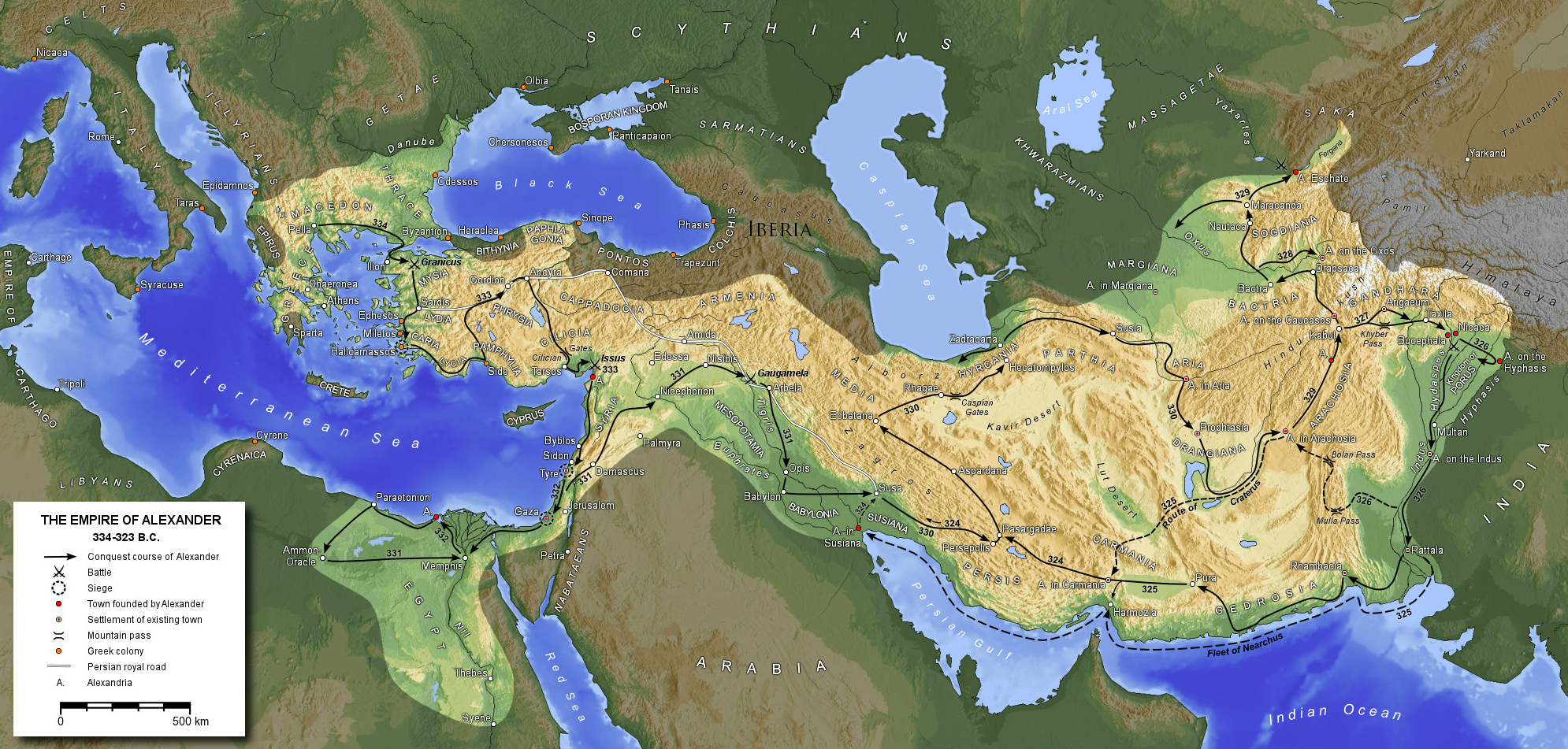
Map of Alexander the Great's empire and the route he and Pyrrho took to India

However, other scholars, such as Stephen Batchelor and Charles Goodman question Beckwith's conclusions about the degree of Buddhist influence on Pyrrho. Conversely, while critical of Beckwith's ideas, Kuzminsky sees credibility in the hypothesis that Pyrrho was influenced by Buddhism, even if it cannot be safely ascertained with our current information.

Ajñana, which upheld radical skepticism, may have been a more powerful influence on Pyrrho than Buddhism. The Buddhists referred to Ajñana's adherents as Amarāvikkhepikas or "eel-wrigglers", due to their refusal to commit to a single doctrine. Scholars including Barua, Jayatilleke, and Flintoff, contend that Pyrrho was influenced by, or at the very least agreed with, Indian skepticism rather than Buddhism or Jainism, based on the fact that he valued ataraxia, which can be translated as "freedom from worry". Jayatilleke, in particular, contends that Pyrrho may have been influenced by the first three schools of Ajñana, since they too valued freedom from worry.

=== Modern ===
Scales in balance: modern symbol of Pyrrhonism

The recovery and publication of the works of Sextus Empiricus, particularly a widely influential translation by Henri Estienne published in 1562, ignited a revival of interest in Pyrrhonism. Philosophers of the time used his works to source their arguments on how to deal with the religious issues of their day. Major philosophers such as Michel de Montaigne, Marin Mersenne, and Pierre Gassendi later drew on the model of Pyrrhonism outlined in Sextus Empiricus' works for their own arguments. This resurgence of Pyrrhonism has sometimes been called the beginning of modern philosophy. Montaigne adopted the image of a balance scale for his motto, which became a modern symbol of Pyrrhonism. It has also been suggested that Pyrrhonism provided the skeptical underpinnings that René Descartes drew from in developing his influential method of Cartesian doubt and the associated turn of early modern philosophy towards epistemology. In the 18th century, David Hume was also considerably influenced by Pyrrhonism, using "Pyrrhonism" as a synonym for "skepticism.".

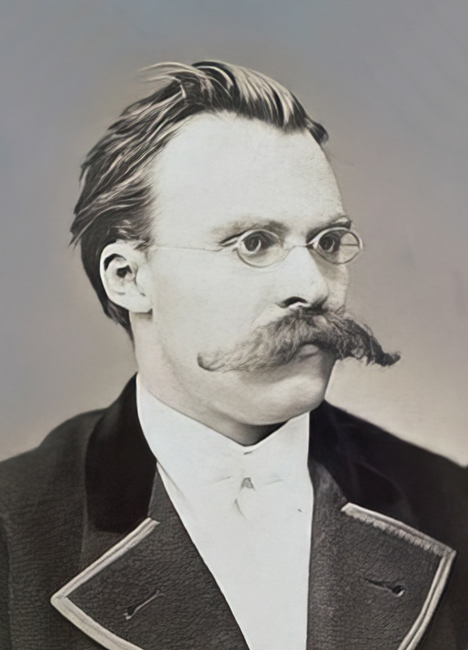
Nietzsche: critic of Pyrrhonian ephectics

Friedrich Nietzsche, however, criticized the "ephectics" of the Pyrrhonists as a flaw of early philosophers, whom he characterized as "shy little blunderer[s] and milquetoast[s] with crooked legs" prone to overindulging "his doubting drive, his negating drive, his wait-and-see ('ephectic') drive, his analytical drive, his exploring, searching, venturing drive, his comparing, balancing drive, his will to neutrality and objectivity, his will to every sine ira et studio: have we already grasped that for the longest time they all went against the first demands of morality and conscience?"

=== Contemporary ===
The term "neo-Pyrrhonism" is used to refer to modern Pyrrhonists such as Benson Mates and Robert Fogelin.

== See also ==
- Apophasis
- Apophatic theology
- Cognitive closure (philosophy)
- Cratylism
- De Docta Ignorantia
- Defeatism
- Quietism
- Buddhism and the Roman world
- Greco-Buddhism
- Ancient Greece–Ancient India relations
- E-Prime
- Nassim Nicholas Taleb
- Trivialism
- The Hedgehog and the Fox
- List of unsolved problems in philosophy
