= What the Tortoise Said to Achilles =

1895 allegorical dialogue by Lewis Carroll

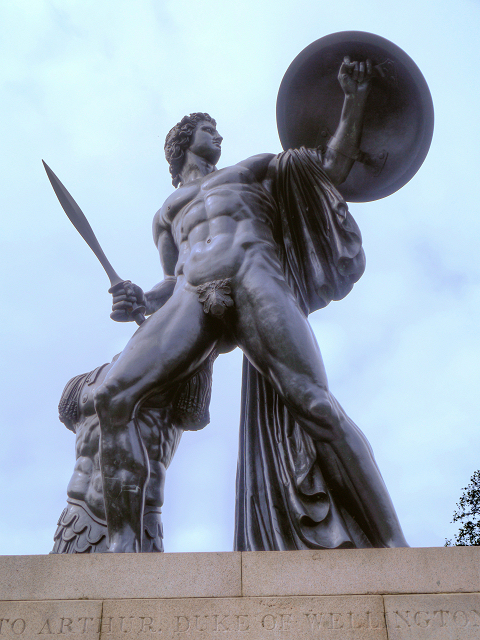
A statue of Achilles forms the Wellington Monument

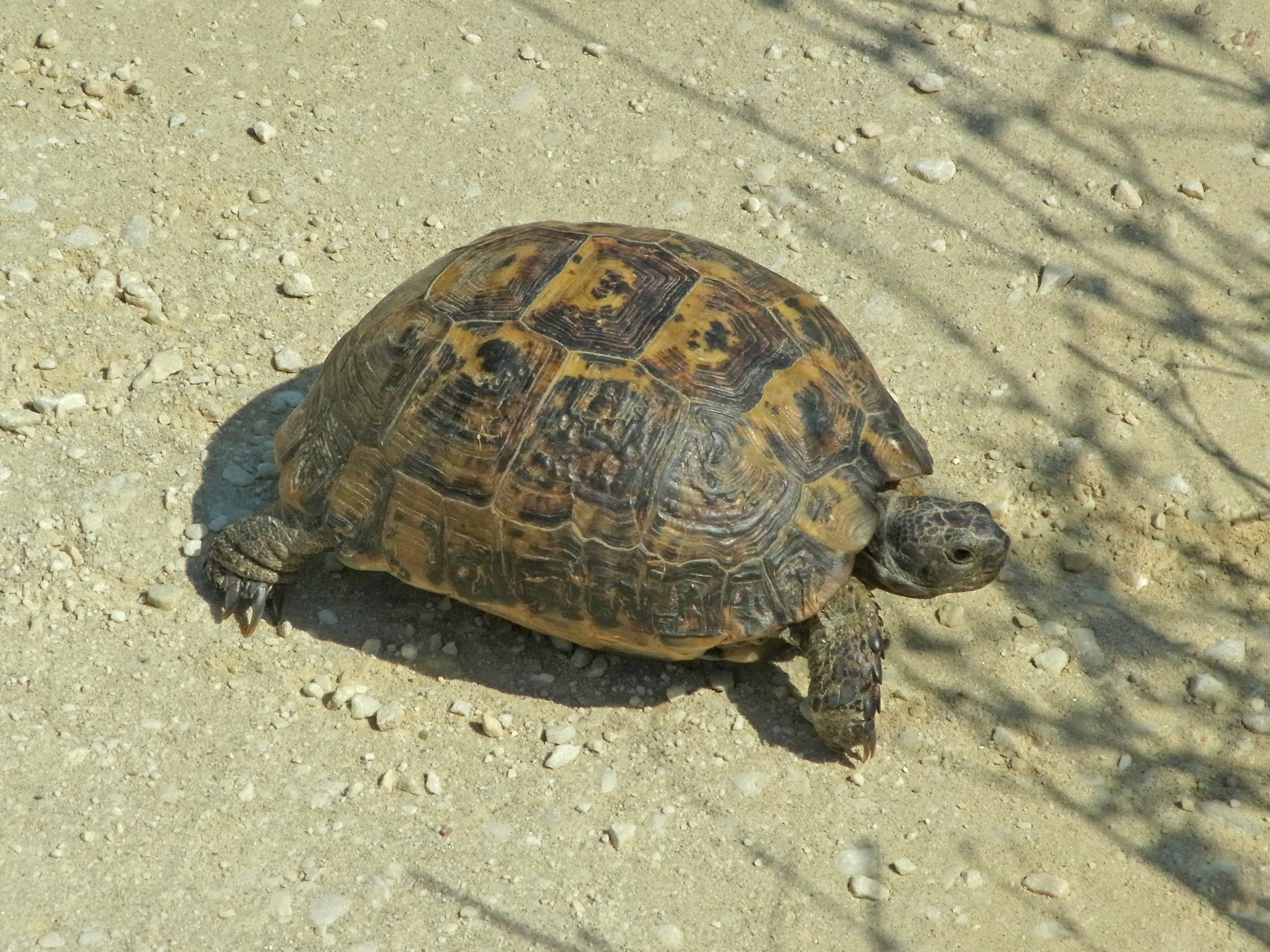
A Greek tortoise

"What the Tortoise Said to Achilles", written by Lewis Carroll in 1895 for the philosophical journal Mind, is a brief allegorical dialogue on the foundations of logic. The title alludes to one of Zeno's paradoxes of motion, in which Achilles could never overtake the tortoise in a race. In Carroll's dialogue, the tortoise challenges Achilles to use the force of logic to make him accept the conclusion of a simple deductive argument. Ultimately, Achilles fails, because the clever tortoise leads him into an infinite regression.

== Summary of the dialogue ==
The discussion begins by considering the following logical argument:

- A: "Things that are equal to the same are equal to each other" (a Euclidean relation)
- B: "The two sides of this triangle are things that are equal to the same"
- Therefore, Z: "The two sides of this triangle are equal to each other"

The tortoise accepts premises A and B as true but not the hypothetical:

- C: "If A and B are true, Z must be true"

The Tortoise claims that it is not "under any logical necessity to accept Z as true". The tortoise then challenges Achilles to force it logically to accept Z as true. Instead of searching the tortoise’s reasons for not accepting C, Achilles asks it to accept C, which it does. After which, Achilles says:

- D: "If A and B and C are true, Z must be true"

The tortoise responds, "That's another Hypothetical, isn't it? And, if I failed to see its truth, I might accept A and B and C, and still not accept Z, mightn't I?"

Again, instead of requesting reasons for not accepting D, he asks the tortoise to accept D. And again, it is "quite willing to grant it", but it still refuses to accept Z. It then tells Achilles to write into his book,

- E: If A and B and C and D are true, Z must be true.

Following this, the Tortoise says: "until I’ve granted that [i.e., E], of course I needn’t grant Z. So it's quite a necessary step". With a touch of sadness, Achilles sees the point.

The story ends by suggesting that the list of premises continues to grow without end, but without explaining the point of the regress.

== Explanation ==
Lewis Carroll was showing that there is a regressive problem that arises from modus ponens deductions:

$$\frac{P \to Q,\; P}{\therefore Q}$$;

or, in words: proposition P (is true) implies Q (is true), and given P, therefore Q.

The regress problem arises because a prior principle is required to explain logical principles, here modus ponens, and once that principle is explained, another principle is required to explain that principle. Thus, if the argumentative chain is to continue, the argument falls into infinite regress. However, if a formal system is introduced whereby modus ponens is simply a rule of inference defined within the system, then it can be abided simply by reasoning within the system. That is not to say that the user reasoning according to this formal system agrees with these rules (consider, for example, the constructivist's rejection of the law of the excluded middle and the dialetheist's rejection of the law of noncontradiction). In this way, formalising logic as a system can be considered as a response to the problem of infinite regress: modus ponens is placed as a rule within the system, the validity of modus ponens is eschewed without the system.

In propositional logic, the logical implication is defined as follows:

P implies Q if and only if the proposition not P or Q is a tautology.

Hence modus ponens, [P ∧ (P → Q)] ⇒ Q, is a valid logical conclusion according to the definition of logical implication just stated. Demonstrating the logical implication simply translates into verifying that the compound truth table produces a tautology. But the tortoise does not accept on faith the rules of propositional logic that this explanation is founded upon. He asks that these rules, too, be subject to logical proof. The tortoise and Achilles do not agree on any definition of logical implication.

In addition, the story hints at problems with the propositional solution. Within the system of propositional logic, no proposition or variable carries any semantic content. The moment any proposition or variable takes on semantic content, the problem arises again because semantic content runs outside the system. Thus, if the solution is to be said to work, then it is to be said to work solely within the given formal system, and not otherwise.

Some logicians (Kenneth Ross, Charles Wright) draw a firm distinction between the conditional connective and the implication relation. These logicians use the phrase not p or q for the conditional connective and the term implies for an asserted implication relation.

== Discussion ==
Several philosophers have tried to resolve Carroll's paradox. Bertrand Russell discussed the paradox briefly in § 38 of The Principles of Mathematics (1903), distinguishing between implication (associated with the form "if p, then q"), which he held to be a relation between unasserted propositions, and inference (associated with the form "p, therefore q"), which he held to be a relation between asserted propositions; having made this distinction, Russell could deny that the Tortoise's attempt to treat inferring Z from A and B as equivalent to, or dependent on, agreeing to the hypothetical "If A and B are true, then Z is true."

Peter Winch, a Wittgensteinian philosopher, discussed the paradox in The Idea of a Social Science and its Relation to Philosophy (1958), where he argued that the paradox showed that "the actual process of drawing an inference, which is after all at the heart of logic, is something which cannot be represented as a logical formula ... Learning to infer is not just a matter of being taught about explicit logical relations between propositions; it is learning to do something" (p. 57). Winch goes on to suggest that the moral of the dialogue is a particular case of a general lesson, to the effect that the proper application of rules governing a form of human activity cannot itself be summed up with a set of further rules, and so that "a form of human activity can never be summed up in a set of explicit precepts" (p. 53).

Carroll's dialogue is apparently the first description of an obstacle to conventionalism about logical truth, later reworked in more sober philosophical terms by W. V. O. Quine.

== Editions ==
Lewis Carroll (April 1895). "What the Tortoise Said to Achilles". Mind. IV (14): 278–280. doi:10.1093/mind/IV.14.278.

Reprinted:

- in the New Series of the same journal, a century later: Lewis Carroll (1 October 1995). "What the Tortoise Said to Achilles". Mind. 104 (416): 691–693. doi:10.1093/mind/104.416.691. JSTOR 2254477.
- in The Penguin Complete Lewis Carroll. Harmondsworth, Penguin. 1982. pp. 1104–1108.
- on a number of websites, including "What the Tortoise Said to Achilles" at Digital Text International, and "What the Tortoise Said to Achilles" at Fair Use Repository.
- on Wikisource: The full text of What the Tortoise Said to Achilles at Wikisource.
- in Douglas Hofstadter (1979). Gödel, Escher, Bach: an Eternal Golden Braid. Basic Books. ISBN 978-0-465-02656-2. Reprinted as the second dialogue, entitled "Two-Part Invention – or What the Tortoise Said to Achilles", between chapters 1 and 2. Hofstadter appropriated the characters of Achilles and the Tortoise for other, original, dialogues in the book which alternate contrapuntally with prose chapters.

As audio:

- What the Tortoise Said to Achilles public domain audiobook at LibriVox

== See also ==
- Deduction theorem
- Homunculus argument
- Münchhausen trilemma
- Paradox
- Regress argument
- Rule of inference

Other works

- Gödel, Escher, Bach, a book by Douglas Hofstadter which includes this story (though retitled as "Two-Part Invention"), and original stories with the Tortoise and Achilles characters
