= Epoché =

Suspension of judgment but also withholding of assent

In Hellenistic philosophy, epoché (also epoche; pronounced /ˈɛpɒki/ or /ˈɛpəki/; Greek: ἐποχή, romanized: epokhē, lit. 'cessation') is suspension of judgment but also "withholding of assent".

== Pyrrhonism ==
Epoché plays an important role in Pyrrhonism, the skeptical philosophy named after Pyrrho, who is regarded as the founder of ancient skepticism. The Pyrrhonists developed the concept of "epoché" to describe the state where all judgments about non-evident matters are suspended to induce a state of ataraxia (freedom from worry and anxiety). The Pyrrhonist philosopher Sextus Empiricus gives this definition: "Epoché is a state of the intellect on account of which we neither deny nor affirm anything." This concept is similarly employed in Academic Skepticism but without the objective of ataraxia.

Pyrrhonism provides practitioners with techniques for achieving epoché through the use of the Ten Modes of Aenesidemus, the Five Modes of Agrippa, and the Pyrrhonist maxims. Pyrrhonism is mostly known today through the writings of the Pyrrhonist philosopher Sextus Empiricus whose surviving works appear to be an encyclopedia of Pyrrhonist arguments for inducing epoché across a breadth of philosophical and other intellectual issues of antiquity. Sextus Empiricus was able to elaborate on the 10 tropes of Aenesidemus and argue syllogistic proofs in every area of speculative knowledge.

== Stoicism ==
In Stoicism, the concept is used to describe the withholding of assent to Phantasia (impressions). For example, Epictetus uses the term in this manner: "If what philosophers say is true, that in all men action starts from one source, feeling, as in assent it is the feeling that a thing is so, and in denial the feeling that it is not so, yes, by Zeus, and in epoché, the feeling that it is uncertain: so also impulse towards a thing is originated by the feeling that it is fitting, and will to get a thing by the feeling that it is expedient for one, and it is impossible to judge."

== Legacy ==
The term was popularized in Phenomenology by Edmund Husserl in 1906. Husserl elaborates the notion of 'bracketing' or 'phenomenological epoché' or 'phenomenological reduction' in Ideas I. Through the systematic procedure of 'phenomenological reduction', one is thought to be able to suspend judgment regarding the general or naive philosophical belief in the existence of the external world, and thus examine phenomena as they are originally given to consciousness. Husserl broke epoché into two distinct categories, "universal epoché" and "local epoché", the former having a stronger effect than the latter. Universal epoché requires leaving behind all assumptions of existence, while local epoché requires setting aside only certain assumptions, often of what is being focused on. One such way this could be applied is the act of seeing a horse. By using local epoché, the viewer would suspend or set aside all prior knowledge of that particular horse, presenting an objective view. In applying universal epoché, the viewer would suspend all knowledge of all horses, or even of all mammals. This essentially creates a blank slate for the object to be viewed as objectively as possible. Husserl also noted that the very process of using epoché never leads to the complete description of an object. What is subject to change is the relationship between the subject and object through the ever-changing consciousness. Husserl uses the term "intentionality" as new levels of meaning present themselves. Acting as a pre-categorical method of separating the object from the subject, Husserl believed that this process would not have an end when applied correctly, as there are infinite modalities we can connect subjects to objects.

According to Jonathan, adopting Husserl's way of thinking, it can be a difficult and daunting task for new researchers. He says one of the biggest problems researchers face is the fact that Husserl constantly changed how he described key parts of epoche, as well as reductions.
