= Victor Brochard =

French philosopher (1848–1907)

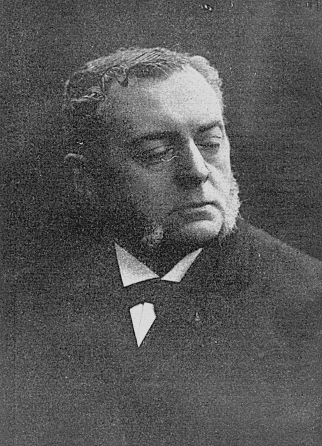
Victor Brochard

Victor Charles Louis Brochard (French: [bʁɔʃaʁ]; 29 June 1848 – 25 November 1907) was a French philosopher and historian of philosophy. He was a proponent of neo-Kantianism, influenced by Charles Renouvier.

== Life ==
Victor Brochard was born in Quesnoy-sur-Deûle. He entered the École Normale Supérieure in 1868, and in 1872 was appointed professor of philosophy at the Lycée de Pau.

After a succession of other lycée appointments, he was appointed lecturer at the École Normale Supérieure in 1886. A few years later he was appointed professor of the history of ancient philosophy at the Sorbonne.

Brochard died in Paris.

Friedrich Nietzsche read and used Brochard's book on the ancient Greek skepticism intensively.

== Works ==
- De l'erreur, 1879.
- (ed.) Discours de la méthode by René Descartes. 1883.
- Les sceptiques grecs, 1887.
- Études de philosophie ancienne et de philosophie moderne, 1912.

== See also ==
- Jules Lachelier
