= Robert Fogelin =

American philosopher (1932–2016)

- Born: June 24, 1932
- Died: October 24, 2016 (aged 84)

Academic background
- Education: Yale University (PhD)
- Thesis: The Definition of Ethical Terms (1960)

Academic work
- Era: Contemporary philosophy
- Region: Western philosophy
- Institutions: Dartmouth College

Robert John Fogelin (June 24, 1932 – October 24, 2016) was an American philosopher, and advocate and leading scholar of modern Pyrrhonism. He was a professor of philosophy and Sherman Fairchild Professor in the humanities (emeritus) at Dartmouth College where he had taught since 1980. He was elected a fellow of the American Academy of Arts and Sciences in 2005.

== Education and career ==
Fogelin received his B.A. from the University of Rochester in 1955. In 1957 he received his M.A. from Yale University and in 1960 his Ph.D. also from Yale. He joined the faculty of Pomona College in 1958. In 1966, he became an associate professor at Yale. He served as master of Yale's Trumbull College from 1973 to 1976. Fogelin remained at Yale until 1980 when he became a professor at Dartmouth.

Fogelin died on October 24, 2016, after struggling with Parkinson's disease.

== Selected publications ==
- Fogelin, Robert J. (1994) Pyrrhonian Reflections on Knowledge and Justification, Oxford: Oxford University Press
- Fogelin, Robert J. (2003) Walking the Tightrope of Reason: The Precarious Life of a Rational Animal, Oxford: Oxford University Press
- Fogelin, Robert J. (1987) Wittgenstein. 2nd ed. The Arguments of Philosophers, London: Routledge and Kegan Paul
- Fogelin, Robert J. (2009) Taking Wittgenstein at His Word, Princeton, Princeton University Press
- Fogelin, Robert J. (2003) A Defense of Hume on Miracles, Princeton, Princeton University Press (part of the Princeton Monographs in Philosophy)
- Fogelin, Robert J. (2009) Hume's Skeptical Crisis: A Textual Study, Oxford: Oxford University Press
- Fogelin, Robert J. (1985) Hume's Skepticism in the Treatise of Human Nature. London: Routledge and Kegan Paul
- Fogelin, Robert J. (1992) Philosophical Interpretations. New York: Oxford University Press
- Fogelin, Robert J. (1988) Figuratively Speaking, New Haven, Yale University Press
- Sinnott-Armstrong, Walter and Fogelin, Robert J. (2009) Understanding Arguments: An Introduction to Informal Logic, Wadsworth Publishing
- Fogelin, Robert; Jones, W.T. (1969). A History of Western Philosophy: The Classical Mind, Volume I (History of Western Philosophy). Cengage Learning. ISBN 0155383124.
