= Is mathematics invented or discovered? =

Philosophical question about the nature of mathematics

Is mathematics invented or discovered? is a question in the philosophy of mathematics concerning whether mathematical objects, concepts, and truths exist independently of human thought, and are therefore discoveries to be found, or are products of human intellectual activity, and are therefore inventions to be made. The question invokes related debates about mathematical realism and broader questions on the nature of mathematical knowledge and the relationship between mathematics and the physical world.

== Overview ==
The epistemological question of whether mathematical knowledge is a priori, capable of being justified independently of experience, or a posteriori, dependent upon empirical experience, is distinct from the question of whether mathematical objects exist independently of human thought. The former concerns the justification of mathematical knowledge, while the latter concerns the nature and existence of the objects of that knowledge.

The distinction between invention and discovery can also be applied separately to the foundations of mathematics, including the concept of natural numbers, the formulation of axioms, the development of logical systems, and the nature of mathematical proof. Whether the birth of mathematics was by chance or induced by necessity during the development of similar subjects, such as physics, remains an area of contention. Different philosophical approaches do not necessarily regard each of these components of mathematics in the same way. For example, mathematical Platonism holds that abstract mathematical objects exist independently of human thought, while other approaches emphasize mathematical objects or systems as constructions dependent upon human intellectual activity.

At least as early as 1969, the question was being explicitly formulated in terms of invention versus discovery. In Extending Understandings of Mathematics, published that year, Roger Osborn wrote:

For centuries the controversy has waxed and waned—is mathematics invented or discovered? Is its structure purely a creation of the mind of man or is it superhuman, awaiting discovery by man?"

Osborn thereby described the debate as a centuries-old controversy, asking whether mathematics was invented or discovered and contrasting mathematics as a creation of the human mind with mathematics as an independently existing structure awaiting discovery.

== Philosophical approaches ==
The question of whether mathematics is invented or discovered depends in part on what is understood to constitute a mathematical object. A mathematical object is an abstract entity arising in mathematics. Commonly encountered mathematical objects include numbers, expressions, shapes, functions, and sets. Mathematical objects can be very complex; for example, theorems, proofs, and even formal theories are considered as mathematical objects in proof theory. Philosophers debate whether such objects have an independent existence outside of human thought or whether their existence is dependent on mental constructs or language.

Mathematical Platonism is a form of realism that holds that mathematical objects exist independently of human thought, language, and practices. Such objects are understood to be abstract, lacking spatiotemporal or causal properties. Under this view, mathematical truths are discovered rather than invented, just as scientific investigation discovers properties of independently existing physical objects. The position is associated with Plato's theory of forms, although contemporary mathematical Platonism is distinguished from Plato's own philosophical doctrines. Prominent proponents have included Kurt Gödel, who argued for a form of mathematical intuition through which mathematical objects could be apprehended.

One objection to mathematical Platonism concerns how human beings could acquire knowledge of mathematical objects if those objects exist independently of human minds and cannot be encountered through sensory experience. This difficulty, associated particularly with philosopher Paul Benacerraf, raises questions about the relationship between accounts of mathematical truth and explanations of mathematical knowledge.

By contrast, mathematical nominalism denies the existence of abstract mathematical objects. Nominalist approaches include mathematical fictionalism, which regards mathematical discourse as useful without requiring that the abstract objects to which it apparently refers actually exist. Other approaches, including formalism, emphasize the manipulation of symbols according to the rules of formal systems rather than the investigation of independently existing mathematical entities.

Mathematical constructivism emphasizes the construction of mathematical objects and proofs, and generally requires constructive justification for claims that mathematical objects exist. Such approaches differ from classical mathematics in their treatment of certain non-constructive proofs. Mathematical structuralism, meanwhile, emphasizes the relationships of mathematical objects within structures rather than their individual identities. Structuralist approaches differ over whether mathematical structures exist independently of human thought, and therefore do not necessarily imply either an exclusively inventionist or discovery-based understanding of mathematics.

== Arguments ==
Astrophysicist Mario Livio, in his 2011 article, "Why Math Works", argues that the distinction between mathematical invention and discovery is not exhaustive, and that people develop mathematical concepts through processes of abstraction and then discover relationships among those concepts, distinguishing human selection and construction of mathematical frameworks from the consequences that mathematicians uncover within them.

Philosopher of mathematics education Paul Ernest's 1999 article, "Is Mathematics Discovered or Invented?", distinguishes between absolutist and fallibilist conceptions of mathematics. The absolutist perspective regards mathematical knowledge as universal, objective, and certain, with mathematical truths existing independently of human activity and being discovered through intuition and established through proof. Ernest identifies Roger Penrose and John D. Barrow as proponents. By contrast, the fallibilist perspective treats mathematics as a historically evolving body of knowledge, with its concepts, definitions, and proofs being subject to development and revision. Ernest associates this perspective with later Ludwig Wittgenstein, Imre Lakatos, and Philip Kitcher.

Ernest argues that the historical development of mathematics supports the fallibilist interpretation, and that mathematical disciplines have tended to emerge in response to practical problems. Examples of external circumstances influencing mathematical developments he cites include development of written arithmetic for commerce and taxation, trigonometry and spherical geometry for astronomy and navigation, and statistics for insurance and actuarial calculation. He also argues that the invention of mathematical systems does not make their conclusions arbitrary, since mathematical reasoning remains constrained by established rules and accepted assumptions. According to Ernest, the invention of mathematical systems is compatible with the subsequent recognition of mathematical relationships unanticipated at the time that the systems themselves were formulated. He compares mathematics to chess, in which the rules are human inventions but their implications may be complex and unexpected, and consequently argues that the discovery of surprising mathematical relationships does not necessarily establish underlying mathematical systems existing independently of human thought.

Mathematician Armand Borel's 1983 essay, "Mathematics: Art and Science", also examines whether mathematical theories exist independently of human thought or are created by mathematicians, and observes that a belief in the independent existence of mathematical reality is widespread among mathematicians, citing G. H. Hardy, who regarded mathematical theorems as discoveries about an external reality, and Charles Hermite, who regarded mathematical truths as existing independently of humanity through divine creation. Borel questions whether the distinction is necessarily meaningful, observing that mathematicians may experience mathematical objects as independently existing, even as they recognize "mathematics" as a human creation. Borel notes the apparent objectivity of mathematics arising from the shared intellectual experience of mathematicians. Mathematical concepts become objective in the sense that they can be understood, communicated, and investigated by different individuals, and "the language of mathematics is so precise, it is ideally suited to defining concepts for which such a consensus exist". Borel considers this sufficient to account for the perception of an independently existing mathematical reality, without requiring a conclusion about whether such a reality exists apart from human thought. Borel further characterizes mathematics as both an intellectual creation and a theoretical and experimental science, with mathematicians investigating a shared body of mathematical objects, theories, and unsolved problems, using the examination of particular cases to develop conjectures and discover general relationships. He emphasizes the coherence and unity of mathematics, by which mathematicians working independently can establish the same theorem, and separately developed mathematical theories potentially later having unexpected connections.

Mathematics educator David Tall, in his 2011 article "Crystalline Concepts in Long-Term Mathematical Invention and Discovery", argues that the two perspectives need not be in conflict, distinguishing choices made in developing mathematical representations and theories from the relationships that necessarily follow within them. For example, he says that different civilizations have devised different numeral systems and methods of calculation, but the numerical relationships they represent are not matters of arbitrary choice. Tall also discusses the development of new mathematical contexts, including non-Euclidean geometry, in which mathematicians choose definitions and assumptions and subsequently uncover their consequences. Tall coined the phrase crystalline concept to describe a mathematical concept with an internally constrained structure of necessary relationships, applying this idea to mathematical thinking developed through the perception of shapes and space, through operations and symbols in arithmetic and algebra, and through axiomatic definitions and proofs. On this account, mathematical concepts are constructed through human thought, but their interrelated properties can still appear inevitable and independent of any particular thinker. Tall cites the view of mathematician Christopher Zeeman, in particular, that mathematical work involves both invention and the discovery of unexpected results, and does not regard this apparent independence as requiring the existence of a separate Platonic mathematical realm.

=== Indispensability of mathematics ===
An argument for the independent existence of mathematical objects arises from the apparent indispensability of mathematics to the natural sciences. The Quine–Putnam indispensability argument, associated with philosophers Willard Van Orman Quine and Hilary Putnam, maintains that mathematical entities should be accepted as existing insofar as they are indispensable to our best scientific theories. The argument holds that because scientific theories depend upon mathematical objects and structures, acceptance of those theories entails an ontological commitment to the mathematical entities upon which they depend.

The argument is related to questions concerning the "unreasonable effectiveness of mathematics", a phrase associated with physicist Eugene Wigner's 1960 essay on the unexpected success of mathematical theories in describing natural phenomena. Borel similarly discusses mathematical theories developed through abstract reasoning that later acquired important scientific applications, including the use of group theory and matrix algebra in quantum mechanics. The usefulness of mathematics in describing physical reality does not, however, by itself resolve the philosophical question of whether mathematical objects exist independently of human thought.

=== Significance to mathematical practice ===
The distinction between mathematical invention and discovery does not necessarily determine how mathematicians conduct their research. The concept of working realism describes the methodological position that mathematics may be practiced as though mathematical objects exist independently of human thought, without necessarily accepting mathematical Platonism as a metaphysical doctrine. This approach supports the use of classical mathematical reasoning, including certain non-constructive methods, without requiring resolution of the ontological question.

The question nevertheless has philosophical significance because different understandings of mathematical existence and truth can influence views about which methods of mathematical reasoning are justified. The debate also concerns the possibility of knowledge about abstract objects, the status of mathematical truths, and the relationship between the human creation of mathematical theories and the discovery of their consequences.
