= Circular reasoning =

Logical fallacy in which the conclusion provides the premise

An example of circular reasoning

Circular reasoning (Latin: circulus in probando, lit. 'circle in proving'; also known as circular logic) is a fallacy in which the reasoner begins with what they are trying to end with. Circular reasoning is not a formal fallacy, but a pragmatic defect in an argument whereby the premises are just as much in need of proof or evidence as the conclusion. As a consequence, the argument becomes a matter of faith and fails to persuade those who do not already accept it. Other ways to express this are that there is no reason to accept the premises unless one already believes the conclusion, or that the premises provide no independent ground or evidence for the conclusion. Circular reasoning is closely related to begging the question, and in modern usage the two generally refer to the same thing.

Circular reasoning is often of the form: "A is true because B is true; B is true because A is true." Circularity can be difficult to detect if it involves a longer chain of propositions.

An example of circular reasoning is: “This statement is correct because it says it is correct.”

== Common forms ==
Circular reasoning can appear in several common forms, each illustrating a different way the conclusion and premise reinforce each other without independent support.

Restatement (begging the question)
The conclusion is simply a rephrasing of the premise. (For example, "This medicine works because it is effective.")
Character or trait loop
A personal quality is justified by behavior, which is then justified by the same quality. ("He is honest because he always tells the truth, and we know he tells the truth because he is honest.")
Definition loop
A term is defined in a way that refers back to itself. ("An expert is someone with expertise.")
Rule or authority loop
A rule or authority is justified by reference to itself or the rule it establishes. ("We must follow the law because it is the law, and it is the law because we must follow it.")

== History ==
The problem of circular reasoning has been noted in Western philosophy at least as far back as the Pyrrhonist philosopher Agrippa who includes the problem of circular reasoning among his Five Tropes of Agrippa. The Pyrrhonist philosopher Sextus Empiricus described the problem of circular reasoning as "the reciprocal trope":

The reciprocal trope occurs when what ought to be confirmatory of the object under investigation needs to be made convincing by the object under investigation; then, being unable to take either in order to establish the other, we suspend judgement about both.

== The problem of induction ==
Joel Feinberg and Russ Shafer-Landau note that "using the scientific method to judge the scientific method is circular reasoning". Scientists attempt to discover the laws of nature and to predict what will happen in the future, based on those laws. The laws of nature are arrived at through inductive reasoning. David Hume's problem of induction demonstrates that one must appeal to the principle of the uniformity of nature if they seek to justify their implicit assumption that laws which held true in the past will also hold true in the future. Since the principle of the uniformity of nature is itself an inductive principle, any justification for induction must be circular. But as Bertrand Russell observed, "The method of 'postulating' what we want has many advantages; they are the same as the advantages of theft over honest toil".

== See also ==
- Affirming the consequent
- Catch-22 (logic)
- Circular definition
- Circular reference
- Circular reporting
- Coherentism
- Formal fallacy
- Ipse dixit
- Ringschluss, a valid form of reasoning involving a cycle of implications
- Paradox
- Polysyllogism
- Self-reference
- Tautology (logic)
