= Justification (epistemology) =

Concept in epistemology

Justification (also called epistemic justification) is a property of beliefs that fulfill certain norms about what a person should believe. Epistemologists often identify justification as a component of knowledge distinguishing it from mere true opinion. They study the reasons why someone holds a belief. Epistemologists are concerned with various features of belief, which include the ideas of warrant (a proper justification for holding a belief), knowledge, rationality, and probability, among others.

Debates surrounding epistemic justification often involve the structure of justification, including whether there are foundational justified beliefs or whether mere coherence is sufficient for a system of beliefs to qualify as justified. Another major subject of debate is the sources of justification, which might include perceptual experience (the evidence of the senses), reason, and authoritative testimony, among others.

== Justification and knowledge ==
"Justification" involves the reasons why someone holds a belief that one should hold based on one's current evidence. Justification is a property of beliefs insofar as they are held blamelessly. In other words, a justified belief is a belief that a person is entitled to hold.

The idea that many philosophers from Plato onward have treated "justified true belief" (JTB) as constituting knowledge has become commonplace in epistemic discussion. It is particularly associated with a theory discussed in his dialogues Meno and Theaetetus. While in fact Plato seems to disavow justified true belief as constituting knowledge at the end of Theaetetus, the claim that Plato unquestioningly accepted this view of knowledge stuck until the proposal of the Gettier problem.

The subject of justification has played a major role in the value of knowledge as "justified true belief". Some contemporary epistemologists, such as Jonathan Kvanvig, assert that justification is not necessary in getting to the truth and avoiding errors. Kvanvig attempts to show that knowledge is no more valuable than true belief, and in the process dismissed the necessity of justification due to justification not being connected to the truth.

== Conceptions of justification ==
William P. Alston identifies two conceptions of justification. One conception is "deontological" justification, which holds that justification evaluates the obligation and responsibility of a person having only true beliefs. This conception implies, for instance, that a person who has made his best effort but is incapable of concluding the correct belief from his evidence is still justified. The deontological conception of justification corresponds to epistemic internalism. Another conception is "truth-conducive" justification, which holds that justification is based on having sufficient evidence or reasons that entails that the belief is at least likely to be true. The truth-conductive conception of justification corresponds to epistemic externalism.

== Theories of justification ==
There are several different views as to what entails justification, mostly focusing on the question "How beliefs are justified?". Different theories of justification require different conditions before a belief can be considered justified. Theories of justification generally include other aspects of epistemology, such as defining knowledge.

Notable theories of justification include:

- Foundationalism – Basic beliefs justify other, non-basic beliefs.
- Epistemic coherentism – Beliefs are justified if they cohere with other beliefs a person holds, each belief is justified if it coheres with the overall system of beliefs.
- Infinitism – Beliefs are justified by infinite chains of reasons.
- Foundherentism – Both fallible foundations and coherence are components of justification—proposed by Susan Haack.
- Internalism and externalism – The believer must be able to justify a belief through internal knowledge (internalism), or outside sources of knowledge (externalism).
- Reformed epistemology – Beliefs are warranted by proper cognitive function—proposed by Alvin Plantinga.
- Evidentialism – Beliefs depend solely on the evidence for them.
- Reliabilism – A belief is justified if it is the result of a reliable process.
- Infallibilism – Knowledge is incompatible with the possibility of being wrong.
- Fallibilism – Claims can be accepted even though they cannot be conclusively proven or justified.
- Non-justificationism – Knowledge is produced by attacking claims and refuting them instead of justifying them.
- Skepticism – Knowledge is impossible or undecidable.

== Criticism of theories of justification ==
Robert Fogelin claims to detect a suspicious resemblance between the theories of justification and Agrippa's five modes leading to the suspension of belief. He concludes that the modern proponents have made no significant progress in responding to the ancient modes of Pyrrhonian skepticism.

William P. Alston criticizes the very idea of a theory of justification. He claims: "There isn't any unique, epistemically crucial property of beliefs picked out by 'justified'. Epistemologists who suppose the contrary have been chasing a will-o'-the-wisp. What has really been happening is this. Different epistemologists have been emphasizing, concentrating on, "pushing" different epistemic desiderata, different features of belief that are positively valuable from the standpoint of the aims of cognition."

== See also ==
- Critical thinking
- Dream argument
- Infinite regress (epistemology)
- Münchhausen trilemma
