= Infallibilism =

Philosophical view

Infallibilism is the epistemological view that propositional knowledge is incompatible with the possibility of being wrong.

== Definition ==
In philosophy, infallibilism (sometimes called "epistemic infallibilism") is the view that knowing the truth of a proposition is incompatible with there being any possibility that the proposition could be false. This is typically understood as indicating that for a belief to count as knowledge, one's evidence or justification must provide one with such strong grounds that the belief must be true, or equivalently, that it is completely impossible for it to be false. The infallibility of such a belief may also mean that it cannot even be doubted.

Infallibilism should not be confused with the view that a proposition P must be true in order for someone to know that P. Instead, the infallibilist holds that a person who knows P could not have all of the same evidence (or justification) that one currently has if P were false, and therefore that one's evidence/justification offers a guarantee of the truth of P. Thus, in cases where a person could have held the same true belief P with the same level of evidence (or justification) and still been wrong, the infallibilist holds that the person does not know P.

The infallibilist defines knowledge in the following way: A person (henceforth S) knows that a proposition (henceforth P) is true if and only if:

1. P is true.
2. S believes that P is true.
3. S is justified in their belief that P is true.
4. S's justification guarantees the truth of P.

According to the infallibilist, fallible beliefs may be rationally justified, but they do not rise to the level of knowledge unless their truth is absolutely certain given one's evidence. The contrary view to infallibilism, known as fallibilism, is the position that a justified true belief may be considered knowledge even if one's evidence does not guarantee its truth, or even if one can rationally doubt it given one's current evidence.

Infallibilism should not be confused with skepticism, which is the view that knowledge is unattainable for rational human beings. While numerous critics of infallibilism claim that defining knowledge according to such high standards collapses into epistemic skepticism, many proponents of infallibilism (although not all) deny that this is the case.

== History ==
René Descartes, an early proponent of infallibilism, argued, "my reason convinces me that I ought not the less carefully to withhold belief from what is not entirely certain and indubitable, than from what is manifestly false".

== Contemporary infallibilism ==
Infallibilism is rejected by most contemporary epistemologists, who generally accept that one can have knowledge based on fallible justification. Baron Reed has provided an account of the reasons why infallibilism is so widely regarded as untenable today.

Broad consensus notwithstanding, some contemporary philosophers have presented arguments in defense of infallibilism and have therefore come to reject fallibilism. For instance, Mark Kaplan defends such a view in a 2006 paper entitled "If You Know You Can't Be Wrong". Other notable contemporary proponents of infallibilism include Andrew Moon, Julien Dutant, and Matthew Benton.

== See also ==
- Infallibility
