= Infinite regress =

Philosophical problem

Infinite regress in the homunculus explanation of perception.

Infinite regress is a philosophical concept in which each entity in an infinite series depends on its predecessor, following a recursive principle. For example, the classic chicken-and-egg paradox illustrates a causal infinite regress: if one assumes that every chicken must hatch from an egg, which in turn must have been laid by a preceding chicken, one gets a causal chain without a first cause.

An infinite regress argument is an argument against a theory based on the fact that this theory leads to an infinite regress. For such an argument to be successful, it must demonstrate not just that the theory in question entails an infinite regress but also that this regress is vicious. There are different ways in which a regress can be vicious. The most serious form of viciousness involves a contradiction in the form of metaphysical impossibility. Other forms occur when the infinite regress is responsible for the theory in question being implausible or for its failure to solve the problem it was formulated to solve.

While it is sometimes assumed without much argument that each infinite regress is vicious, this assumption is not universally accepted. Some philosophers have explicitly defended theories with infinite regresses, but the more common strategy has been to reformulate the theory in question in a way that avoids the regress. One such strategy is foundationalism, which posits that there is a first element in the series from which all the other elements arise but which is not itself explained this way. Another way is coherentism, which is based on a holistic explanation that usually sees the entities in question not as a linear series but as an interconnected network.

Infinite regress arguments have been made in various areas of philosophy. Famous examples include the cosmological argument and Bradley's regress, and some of Zeno's paradoxes.

== Definition ==
An infinite regress is an infinite series of entities governed by a recursive principle that determines how each entity in the series depends on or is produced by its predecessor. This principle can often be expressed in the following form: X is F because X stands in R to Y and Y is F. X and Y stand for objects, R stands for a relation and F stands for a property in the widest sense. In the epistemic regress, for example, a belief is justified because it is based on another belief that is justified. But this other belief is itself in need of one more justified belief for itself to be justified and so on. Or in the cosmological argument, an event occurred because it was caused by another event that occurred before it, which was itself caused by a previous event, and so on. This principle by itself is not sufficient: it does not lead to a regress if there is no X that is F. This is why an additional triggering condition has to be fulfilled: there has to be an X that is F for the regress to get started. So the regress starts with the fact that X is F. According to the recursive principle, this is only possible if there is a distinct Y that is also F. But in order to account for the fact that Y is F, we need to posit a Z that is F and so on. Once the regress has started, there is no way of stopping it since a new entity has to be introduced at each step in order to make the previous step possible.

An infinite regress argument is an argument against a theory based on the fact that this theory leads to an infinite regress. For such an argument to be successful, it has to demonstrate not just that the theory in question entails an infinite regress but also that this regress is vicious. The mere existence of an infinite regress by itself is not a proof for anything. So in addition to connecting the theory to a recursive principle paired with a triggering condition, the argument has to show in which way the resulting regress is vicious.

For instance, Scott MacDonald discusses Thomas Aquinas’s example of someone who holds both that every justification is inferential and that the premises of an inference must have their own justification. One can show (1) that this theory leads to an infinite regress of justifications (e.g. by pointing out the recursive principle and the triggering condition) and (2) that this infinite regress is vicious (e.g. by showing that it is implausible given the limitations of the human mind).

Similarly, Daniel Nolan highlights the classic chicken-and-egg paradox to show how an infinite regress of causes becomes vicious. He notes that the premise 'every chicken hatches from an egg laid by a chicken' creates an endless regress if we assume neither came first. He says that, while this sequence is not logically flawed or circular on its own, it becomes an objectionable, vicious regress because it contradicts the empirical fact that there was a time in the past when the Earth was just swirling dust and gas, meaning neither chickens nor eggs yet existed and the biological sequence had to start somewhere.

In these examples, the argument has a negative form since it only denies that another theory is true. However, infinite regress arguments can also be used in a positive form to support a theory by showing that its alternative involves a vicious regress. This is how one version of the cosmological argument for the existence of God works: it claims that positing God's existence is necessary in order to avoid an infinite regress of causes.

== Viciousness ==
For an infinite regress argument to be successful, it has to show that the involved regress is vicious. A non-vicious regress is called virtuous or benign. It is sometimes assumed without argument that each infinite regress is vicious. However, this assumption is not generally accepted, and in many cases, it may not be self-evident whether an infinite regress is vicious or not. The truth regress constitutes an example of an infinite regress that is not vicious: if the proposition "P" is true, then the proposition that "It is true that P" is also true and so on. Infinite regresses pose a problem mostly if the regress concerns concrete objects. Abstract objects, on the other hand, are often considered to be unproblematic in this respect. For example, the truth-regress leads to an infinite number of true propositions or the Peano axioms entail the existence of infinitely many natural numbers. But these regresses are usually not held against the theories that entail them.

There are different ways in which a regress can be vicious. The most serious type of viciousness involves a contradiction in the form of metaphysical impossibility. Other types occur when the infinite regress is responsible for the theory in question being implausible or for its failure to solve the problem it was formulated to solve. The vice of an infinite regress can be local if it causes problems only for certain theories when combined with other assumptions, or global otherwise. For example, an otherwise virtuous regress is locally vicious for a theory that posits a finite domain. In some cases, an infinite regress is not itself the source of the problem but merely indicates a different underlying problem.

=== Impossibility ===
Infinite regresses that involve metaphysical impossibility are the most serious cases of viciousness. The easiest way to arrive at this result is by accepting the assumption that actual infinities are impossible, thereby directly leading to a contradiction. This anti-infinitists position is opposed to infinity in general, not just specifically to infinite regresses. But it is open to defenders of the theory in question to deny this outright prohibition on actual infinities. For example, it has been argued that only certain types of infinities are problematic in this way, like infinite intensive magnitudes (e.g. infinite energy densities). But other types of infinities, like infinite cardinality (e.g. infinitely many causes) or infinite extensive magnitude (e.g. the duration of the universe's history) are unproblematic from the point of view of metaphysical impossibility. While there may be some instances of viciousness due to metaphysical impossibility, most vicious regresses are problematic because of other reasons.

=== Implausibility ===
A more common form of viciousness arises from the implausibility of the infinite regress in question. This category often applies to theories about human actions, states or capacities. This argument is weaker than the argument from impossibility since it allows that the regress in question is possible. It only denies that it is actual. For example, it seems implausible due to the limitations of the human mind that there are justified beliefs if this entails that the agent needs to have an infinite amount of them. But this is not metaphysically impossible, e.g. if it is assumed that the infinite number of beliefs are only non-occurrent or dispositional while the limitation only applies to the number of beliefs one is actually thinking about at one moment. Another reason for the implausibility of theories involving an infinite regress is due to the principle known as Ockham's razor, which posits that we should avoid ontological extravagance by not multiplying entities without necessity. Considerations of parsimony are complicated by the distinction between quantitative and qualitative parsimony: concerning how many entities are posited in contrast to how many kinds of entities are posited. For example, the cosmological argument for the existence of God promises to increase quantitative parsimony by positing that there is one first cause instead of allowing an infinite chain of events. But it does so by decreasing qualitative parsimony: it posits God as a new type of entity.

=== Failure to explain ===
Another form of viciousness applies not to the infinite regress by itself but to it in relation to the explanatory goals of a theory. Theories are often formulated with the goal of solving a specific problem, e.g. of answering the question why a certain type of entity exists. One way how such an attempt can fail is if the answer to the question already assumes in disguised form what it was supposed to explain. This is akin to the informal fallacy of begging the question. From the perspective of a mythological world view, for example, one way to explain why the earth seems to be at rest instead of falling down is to hold that it rests on the back of a giant turtle. In order to explain why the turtle itself is not in free fall, another even bigger turtle is posited and so on, resulting in a world that is turtles all the way down. Despite its shortcomings in clashing with modern physics and due to its ontological extravagance, this theory seems to be metaphysically possible assuming that space is infinite. One way to assess the viciousness of this regress is to distinguish between local and global explanations. A local explanation is only interested in explaining why one thing has a certain property through reference to another thing without trying to explain this other thing as well. A global explanation, on the other hand, tries to explain why there are any things with this property at all. So as a local explanation, the regress in the turtle theory is benign: it succeeds in explaining why the earth is not falling. But as a global explanation, it fails because it has to assume rather than explain at each step that there is another thing that is not falling. It does not explain why nothing at all is falling.

It has been argued that infinite regresses can be benign under certain circumstances despite aiming at global explanation. This line of thought rests on the idea of the transmission involved in the vicious cases: it is explained that X is F because Y is F where this F was somehow transmitted from Y to X. The problem is that to transfer something, it first must be possessed, so the possession is presumed rather than explained. For example, in trying to explain why one's neighbor has the property of being the owner of a bag of sugar, it is revealed that this bag was first in someone else's possession before it was transferred to the neighbor and that the same is true for this and every other previous owner. This explanation is unsatisfying since ownership is presupposed at every step. In non-transmissive explanations, however, Y is still the reason for X being F and Y is also F but this is just seen as a contingent fact. This line of thought has been used to argue that the epistemic regress is not vicious. From a Bayesian point of view, for example, justification or evidence can be defined in terms of one belief raising the probability that another belief is true. The former belief may also be justified but this is not relevant for explaining why the latter belief is justified.

== Responses ==
Philosophers have responded to infinite regress arguments in various ways. The criticized theory can be defended, for example, by denying that an infinite regress is involved. Infinitists, on the other hand, embrace the regress but deny that it is vicious. Another response is to modify the theory in order to avoid the regress. This can be achieved in the form of foundationalism or of coherentism.

=== Foundationalism ===
Traditionally, the most common response is foundationalism. It posits that there is a first element in the series from which all the other elements arise but which is not itself explained this way. So from any given position, the series can be traced back to elements on the most fundamental level, which the recursive principle fails to explain. This way an infinite regress is avoided. This position is well-known from its applications in the field of epistemology. Foundationalist theories of epistemic justification state that besides inferentially justified beliefs, which depend for their justification on other beliefs, there are also non-inferentially justified beliefs. The non-inferentially justified beliefs constitute the foundation on which the superstructure consisting of all the inferentially justified beliefs rests. Acquaintance theories, for example, explain the justification of non-inferential beliefs through acquaintance with the objects of the belief. On such a view, an agent is inferentially justified to believe that it will rain tomorrow based on the belief that the weather forecast told so. They are non-inferentially justified in believing that they are in pain because they are directly acquainted with the pain. So a different type of explanation (acquaintance) is used for the foundational elements.

Another example comes from the field of metaphysics concerning the problem of ontological hierarchy. One position in this debate claims that some entities exist on a more fundamental level than other entities and that the latter entities depend on or are grounded in the former entities. Metaphysical foundationalism is the thesis that these dependence relations do not form an infinite regress: that there is a most fundamental level that grounds the existence of the entities from all other levels. This is sometimes expressed by stating that the grounding-relation responsible for this hierarchy is well-founded.

=== Coherentism ===
Coherentism, mostly found in the field of epistemology, is another way to avoid infinite regresses. It is based on a holistic explanation that usually sees the entities in question not as a linear series but as an interconnected network. For example, coherentist theories of epistemic justification hold that beliefs are justified because of the way they hang together: they cohere well with each other. This view can be expressed by stating that justification is primarily a property of the system of beliefs as a whole. The justification of a single belief is derivative in the sense that it depends on the fact that this belief belongs to a coherent whole. Laurence BonJour is a well-known contemporary defender of this position.

== Examples ==
=== Aristotle ===
Aristotle argued that knowing does not necessitate an infinite regress because some knowledge does not depend on demonstration:

Our own doctrine is that not all knowledge is demonstrative: on the contrary, knowledge of the immediate premises is independent of demonstration. (The necessity of this is obvious; for since we must know the prior premises from which the demonstration is drawn, and since the regress must end in immediate truths, those truths must be indemonstrable.) Such, then, is our doctrine, and in addition, we maintain that besides scientific knowledge there is its original source which enables us to recognize the definitions.

— Aristotle, Posterior Analytics I.3 72b1–15

=== Philosophy of mind ===
Gilbert Ryle argues in the philosophy of mind that mind-body dualism is implausible because it produces an infinite regress of "inner observers" when trying to explain how mental states are able to influence physical states.

== See also ==
- Action (philosophy) § Basic and non-basic
- Antecedent-contained deletion
- Axiology § Intrinsic value
- Bradley's regress
- Chicken or the egg
- Cosmological argument
- Droste effect
- First cause
- Fractal
- Gunk (mereology)
- Homunculus argument
- Münchhausen trilemma
- Recursion
- Third man argument
- The Unreality of Time § The contradiction of the A-series
- What the Tortoise Said to Achilles
- Zeno's paradoxes
