= Clark Glymour =

American philosopher (born 1942)

- Born: Clark N. Glymour; 1942 (age 83–84)

Academic background
- Education: University of New Mexico; Indiana University Bloomington (Ph.D., 1969)
- Doctoral advisor: Wesley C. Salmon

Academic work
- Institutions: Carnegie Mellon University
- Doctoral students: Michael Friedman; Tim Maudlin
- Main interests: Philosophy of science

Clark N. Glymour (born 1942) is an American philosopher who is the Alumni University Professor Emeritus in the Department of Philosophy at Carnegie Mellon University. He is also a senior research scientist at the Florida Institute for Human and Machine Cognition.

== Work ==
Glymour earned undergraduate degrees in chemistry and philosophy at the University of New Mexico. He did graduate work in chemical physics and obtained a Ph.D. in History and Philosophy of Science from Indiana University Bloomington in 1969.

Glymour is the founder of the Philosophy Department at Carnegie Mellon University, a Guggenheim Fellow, a Fellow of the Center for Advanced Study in Behavioral Sciences, a Phi Beta Kappa lecturer, and is a Fellow of the statistics section of the AAAS. Glymour and his collaborators created the causal interpretation of Bayes nets. His areas of interest include epistemology (particularly Android epistemology), machine learning, automated reasoning, psychology of judgment, and mathematical psychology. One of Glymour's main contributions to the philosophy of science is in the area of Bayesian probability, particularly in his analysis of the Bayesian "problem of old evidence". Glymour, in collaboration with Peter Spirtes and Richard Scheines, also developed an automated causal inference algorithm implemented as software named TETRAD. Using multivariate statistical data as input, TETRAD rapidly searches from among all possible causal relationship models and returns the most plausible causal models based on conditional dependence relationships between those variables. The algorithm is based on principles from statistics, graph theory, philosophy of science, and artificial intelligence. An algorithm used in learning the structure of Bayesian networks, the PC algorithm, is named after the inventors' first names, Peter Spirtes and Clark Glymour.

== Publications ==
=== Books ===
- Conference on the Foundations of Space-Time Theories (1977). Earman, John; Glymour, Clark N; Stachel, John J (eds.). Foundations of space-time theories. Minneapolis: University of Minnesota Press. ISBN 978-0-8166-5752-0. OCLC 783679604.
- Theory and Evidence (Princeton, 1980)
- Examining Holistic Medicine (with D. Stalker), Prometheus, 1985
- Foundations of Space-Time Theories (with J. Earman), University of Minnesota Press, 1986
- Discovering Causal Structure (with R. Scheines, P. Spirtes and K.Kelly) Academic Press, 1987
- Glymour, Clark N; Stalker, Douglas Frank, eds. (1989). Examining holistic medicine. Buffalo, N.Y.: Prometheus Books. ISBN 978-0-87975-553-9. OCLC 978008570.
- Causation, Prediction and Search (with P.Spirtes and R. Scheines), Springer, 1993, 2nd Edition MIT Press, 2001
- Thinking Things Through, MIT Press, 1994
- Android Epistemology (with K. Ford and P. Hayes) MIT/AAAI Press, 1996
- The Mind's Arrows: Bayes Nets and Graphical Causal Models in Psychology, MIT Press, 2001
- Earman, John; Glymour, Clark N; Mitchell, Sandra D, eds. (2003). Ceteris paribus laws. Dordrecht; Boston: Kluwer Academic Publishers. ISBN 978-1-4020-1020-0. OCLC 949277608.
- Galileo in Pittsburgh Harvard University Press, 2010.

=== Journal articles ===
- Glymour, Clark; Ramsey, Joseph D.; Zhang, Kun (2019). "The Evaluation of Discovery: Models, Simulation and Search through "Big Data"". Open Philosophy. 2: 39–48. doi:10.1515/opphil-2019-0005.
- "When is a Brain Like the Planet?", Philosophy of Science, 2008.
- (with David Danks) "Reasons as Causes in Bayesian Epistemology", Journal of Philosophy, 2008.
- "Markov Properties and Quantum Experiments", in W. Demopoulos and I. Pitowsky, eds. Physical Theory and Its Interpretation: Essays in Honor of Jeffrey Bub, Springer 2006.
- (with Chu, T. and David Danks) "Data Driven Methods for Granger Causality and Contemporaneous Causality with Non-Linear Corrections: Climate Teleconnection Mechanisms", 2004.
- "Review of Phil Dowe and Paul Nordhoff: Cause and Chance: Causation in an Indeterministic World", Mind, 2005.
- (with Eberhardt, Frederick, and Richard Scheines). "N-1 Experiments Suffice to Determine the Causal Relations Among N Variables", 2004.
- (with F. Eberhardt and R. Scheines), "Log2(N) Experiments are Sufficient, and in the Worst Case Necessary, for Identifying Causal Structure", UAI Proceedings, 2005
- (with Handley, Daniel, Nicoleta Serban, David Peters, Robert O'Doherty, Melvin Field, Larry Wasserman, Peter Spirtes, and Richard Scheines), "Evidence of systematic expressed sequence tag IMAGE clone cross-hybridization on cDNA microarrays", Genomics, Volume 83, Issue 6 (June, 2004), pages 1169–1175.
- (with Handley, Daniel, Nicoleta Serban, and David G. Peters). "Concerns About Unreliable Data from Spotted cDNA Microarrays Due to Cross-Hybridization and Sequence Errors", Statistical Applications in Genetics and Molecular Biology, Volume 3, Issue 1 (October 6, 2004), Article 25.
- "Comment on D. Lerner", "The Illusion of Conscious Will", Behavioral and Brain Sciences, in press.
- "Review of Joseph E. Early, Sr. (Ed.): Chemical Explanation: Characteristics, Development, Autonomy", Philosophy of Science, Volume 71, Number 3 (July, 2004), pages 415–418.
- (with Spirtes, and Peter Glymour). "Causal Inference", Encyclopedia of Social Science, in press
- "We believe in freedom of the will so that we can learn", Behavioral and Brain Sciences, Volume 27, Number 5 (2004), pages 661–662.
- "The Automation of Discovery", Daedelus, Volume Winter (2004), pages 69–77.
- (with Serban, Nicoleta, Larry Wasserman, David Peters, Peter Spirtes, Robert O'Doherty, Dan Handley, and Richard Scheines). "Analysis of microarray data for treated fat cells", (2003).
- (with Danks, David, and Peter Spirtes). "The Computational and Experimental Complexity of Gene Perturbations for Regulatory Network Search", (2003).
- (with Silva, Ricardo, Richard Scheines, and Peter Spirtes). "Learning Measurement Models for Unobserved Variables", UAI '03, Proceedings of the 19th Conference in Uncertainty in Artificial Intelligence, August 7–10, 2003, Acapulco, Mexico (2003), pages 543–550.
- (with Danks, David and Peter Spirtes). "The Computational and Experimental Complexity of Gene Perturbations for Regulatory Network Search", Proceedings of IJCAI-2003 Workshop on Learning Graphical Models for Computational Genomics, (2003), pages 22–31.
- (with Frank Wimberly, Thomas Heiman, and Joseph Ramsey). "Experiments on the Accuracy of Algorithms for Inferring the Structure of Genetic Regulatory Networks from Microarray Expression Levels", International Joint Conference on Artificial Intelligence Workshop, 2003
- "A Semantics and Methodology for Ceteris Paribus Hypotheses", Erkenntnis, Volume 57 (2002), pages 395–405.
- "Review of James Woodward, Making Things Happen: A Theory of Causal Explanation", British Journal for Philosophy of Science, Volume 55 (2004), pages 779–790.
- (with Fienberg, Stephen, and Richard Scheines). "Expert statistical testimony and epidemiological evidence: the toxic effects of lead exposure on children", Journal of Econometrics, Volume 113 (2003), pages 33–48.
- "Learning, prediction and causal Bayes Nets", Trends in Cognitive Sciences, Volume 7, Number 1 (2003), pages 43–47.
- (with Alison Gopnik, David M. Sobel, Laura E. Schulz, Tamar Kushnir, and David Danks). "A theory of causal learning in children: Causal maps and Bayes nets", Psychological Review, Volume 111, Number 1 (2004).
- "Freud, Kepler, and the clinical evidence", in R. Wollheim and J. Hopkins, eds. Philosophical Essays on Freud, Cambridge University Press 1982.
- and many others dating back to 1970.
