= Evidentialism =

Thesis in epistemology

Evidentialism is a thesis in epistemology which states that one is justified to believe something if and only if that person has evidence which supports said belief. Evidentialism is, therefore, a thesis about which beliefs are justified and which are not.

For philosophers Richard Feldman and Earl Conee, evidentialism is the strongest argument for justification because it identifies the primary notion of epistemic justification. They argue that if a person's attitude towards a proposition fits their evidence, then their doxastic attitude for that proposition is epistemically justified. Feldman and Conee offer the following argument for evidentialism as an epistemic justification:

(EJ) Doxastic attitude D toward proposition p is epistemically justified for S at t if and only if having D toward p fits the evidence.

For Feldman and Conee one's doxastic attitude is justified if it fits one's evidence. EJ is meant to show the idea that justification is characteristically epistemic. This idea makes justification dependent on evidence.

Feldman and Conee believe that because objections to EJ have become so prominent their defense for it is appropriate. The theses that object EJ are implying that epistemic justification is dependent upon the "cognitive capacities of an individual or upon the cognitive processes or information-gatherings practices that lead to an attitude." For Feldman and Conee, EJ is in contrast to these theses; EJ contends that the epistemic justification for an attitude is only dependent upon evidence.

== Criticism ==
Critics of evidentialism sometimes reject the claim that a conclusion is justified only if one's evidence supports that conclusion. A typical counterexample goes like this. Suppose, for example, that Babe Ruth approaches the batter's box believing that he will hit a home run despite his current drunkenness and overall decline in performance in recent games. He realizes that, however unlikely it is that his luck will change, it would increase his chances of hitting a home run if he maintains a confident attitude. In these circumstances, critics of evidentialism argue that his belief that p = Babe Ruth will hit a home run is justified, even though his evidence does not support this belief.

Evidentialists may respond to this criticism by forming a distinction between pragmatic or prudential justification and epistemic justification. In Babe Ruth's case, it is pragmatically justified that he believe p, but it is nevertheless epistemically unjustified: though the belief may be justified for the purpose of promoting some other goal (a successful at bat, in Ruth's case), it is not justified relative to the purely epistemic goal of having beliefs that are most likely to be true.

A similar response follows the criticism that evidentialism implies all faith-based beliefs are unjustified. For example, fideism claims that evidence is irrelevant to religious beliefs and that attempts to justify religious beliefs in such a way are misguided. Superficially, fideism and evidentialism have mutually exclusive takes on religious beliefs, but evidentialists use the term "justification" in a much weaker sense than the one in which fideists most likely use it. Evidentialism merely defines the epistemic condition of a belief.

Although evidentialism states that the content of the evidence does not matter, only that it constitutes valid justification towards some proposition, a skeptical criticism may be levelled at evidentialism from uncertainty theories. One's evidence may be objectively disproved at some point or it may be the case that one can never have absolute certainty of one's evidence. Given the logic of arguments concerning principles of uncertainty and randomness, skepticism towards knowledge merely becomes skepticism towards valid justification.

Likewise, some say that the human mind is not naturally inclined to form beliefs based on evidence, viz. cognitive dissonance. While this may be the case, evidentialists admit, evidentialism is only meant to separate justified beliefs from unjustified beliefs. One can believe that evidentialism is true yet still maintain that the human mind is not naturally inclined to form beliefs based on evidence. He would simply have to conclude that the mind is not naturally inclined to form justified beliefs.

== Infinite regress argument ==
Evidentialism also faces a challenge from the infinite regress argument. This argument begins with the observation that, normally, one's supporting evidence for a belief consists of other beliefs. However, it seems that these other beliefs can do the job of justifying only if they themselves are already justified. And evidentialism demands that these supporting beliefs be justified by still further evidence if they are to be justified themselves. But this same reasoning would apply to the new, deeper level of supporting beliefs: they can only justify if they're themselves justified, and evidentialism therefore demands an even deeper level of supporting belief. According to this argument, a justified belief requires an endless supply of reasons. Some philosophers such as Thomas Nagel posit that this is an absurd conclusion.

In general, responses to this argument can be classified in the following ways:

- Foundationalism: There exist beliefs that are justified, but not because they are based on any other beliefs. These are called properly basic beliefs, and they are the foundation upon which all other justified beliefs ultimately rest.
- Coherentism: Justified beliefs are all evidentially supported by other beliefs, but an infinite set of beliefs is not generated, because the chains of evidential support among beliefs is allowed to move in a circle. On the resulting picture, a person's belief is justified when it fits together with the person's other beliefs in a coherent way in which the person's various beliefs mutually support one another.

A modest reasoner subset of Coherentism would insist that all justifiable beliefs be statements about "some objects" since the negation/complement of a some statement is another some statement.

- Skepticism: There cannot be any justified beliefs.

A modest reasoner subset of Scepticism like the subset of Coherentism would likewise insist and define all justifiable beliefs be statements about "some objects" since the negation/complement of a some statement is another some statement.

- Infinitism: Aside from these responses, some philosophers have said that evidential chains terminate in beliefs that are not justified. Others have said that, indeed, there can exist infinite chains of reasons.

Of the main responses, coherentism and skepticism are clearly consistent with evidentialism. Coherentism allows evidential support for all of our justified beliefs in the face of the regress argument by allowing for circular chains of evidential support among beliefs. And the skeptic here is utilizing an evidentialist demand to arrive at her skeptical conclusion.

But because the resulting skepticism is so sweeping and devastating, and because so many reject the legitimacy of the circular reasoning embraced by the coherentist, foundationalism is the favored response of many philosophers to the regress argument. And foundationalism does not so clearly fit together with evidentialism. At first glance, at least, the "basic" beliefs of the foundationalist would appear to be counterexamples to the evidentialist's thesis, in that they are justified beliefs that are not rational because they are not supported by deeper evidence.

== Non-evidentialist theories of knowledge and justification ==
Many contemporary epistemologists reject the view that evidential support is the whole story about the justification of beliefs. While no sensible epistemologists generally urge people to disregard their evidence when forming beliefs, many believe that a more complete theory would introduce considerations about the processes that initiate and sustain beliefs. An example of one such theory is reliabilism. The most influential proponent of reliabilism is Alvin Goldman. According to a crude form of reliabilism, S is justified in believing p if and only if S's belief in p is caused by a reliable process—a process that generally leads to true beliefs. Some of these reliable processes may require the processing of evidence; many others won't. So, Goldman would argue, evidentialism, on which the justification of a belief always turns completely on the issue of the belief's evidential support, is false. Likewise, evidentialism will be rejected by more sophisticated versions of reliabilism, some of which will allow evidence an important but limited role, as opposed to the all-encompassing role assigned to it by evidentialism.

Other non-evidentialist theories include: the causal theory, according to which S knows p if and only if S's belief in p is causally connected in an appropriate way with S's believing p; and Robert Nozick's truth tracking theory, according to which S knows p if and only if (i) p is true, (ii) S believes p, (iii) S's attitude toward p tracks the truth value of p in that, when p is not true, S does not believe p and when p is true, S does believe p.

Another alternative perspective, promoted by David Hume's 18th-century opponent, Presbyterian philosopher Thomas Reid, and perhaps hinted at by Hume himself, at least in some moods (though this is a very controversial issue in interpreting Hume), has it that some of our "natural" beliefs—beliefs we are led to form by natural features of the human constitution—have what can be called an "innocent-until-proven-guilty" status. Contrary to evidentialism, they can be justified in the absence of any effective evidence that supports them. They are justified just so long as one doesn't have good reason to think them false.

A new account of the extent of our evidence is Timothy Williamson's claim that E=K: one's evidence is what one knows. Going by the "letter of the law," Williamson's resulting theory is not contrary to, but is rather an instance of, evidentialism. By allowing our evidence to encompass everything we know, Williamson is able to give thoroughly evidentialist accounts of many important epistemological concepts. But, traditionally, evidentialists have presupposed much more restrictive accounts of what our evidence is. Thus, Williamson's theory is opposed to the spirit of much traditional evidentialism, primarily because it turns evidentialism from an internalist account of justification to an externalist account (due to the factive nature of knowledge.) However, Williamson's work may point to a quite general way to modify traditional evidentialism to make it better able to meet the challenges it faces: whether or not one goes so far as to accept that E=K, broadening one's view of what constitutes our evidence may provide a way to address many of the objections to evidentialism, especially to those disinclined to swallow skeptical consequences of a view
