= Theory of knowledge (disambiguation) =

The theory of knowledge, or epistemology, is a branch of philosophy.

- Theory of knowledge (IB course), a course subject in the IB programme
- Theory of Knowledge, a book by Roderick Chisholm
