= Michael P. Lynch =

American philosopher

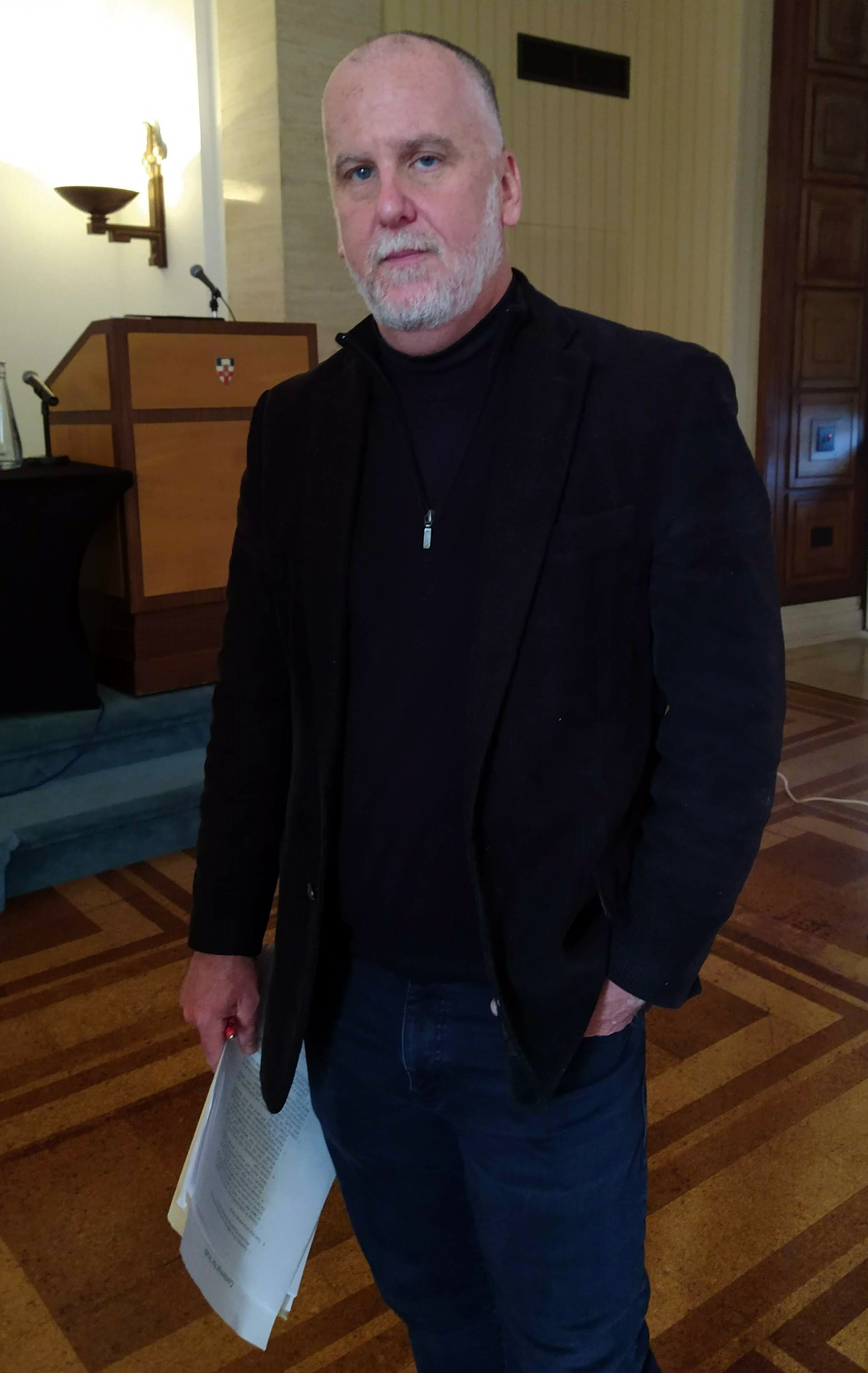
- Michael Patrick Lynch at Senate House
- Born: Michael Patrick Lynch; 1966 (age 59–60)

Philosophical work
- Era: Contemporary philosophy
- Region: Western philosophy
- School: Analytic
- Main interests: Truth; Epistemology

Michael Patrick Lynch (born 1966) is an American philosopher who is Provost Professor of the Humanities and Board of Trustees Distinguished Professor of Philosophy at the University of Connecticut. From 2014 to 2023 he was also the director of the University of Connecticut Humanities Institute. As director of the Humanities Institute, he headed a Templeton-funded project on humility and conviction in public life.

== Career ==
Lynch's early work focused on various issues in the philosophy of truth. He has argued for a form of robust realism about truth that acknowledges some truths as relative without entailing nihilism about truth itself. Lynch argues for a coherence theory of truth, which allows for a limited form of relativism.

His work on the value of truth has also attracted attention, including critical reactions from philosophers ranging from Marian David to Richard Rorty.

Lynch's primary work is as one of the foremost developers of the pluralist theory of truth. He argues that truth is a functional concept, i.e. a concept which is defined in terms of platitudes characterizing its theoretical role in our inquiry, following functionalism in the philosophy of mind (see functionalism (philosophy of mind). Lynch pairs his functionalism about truth with a multiple realizability thesis, arguing that the truth role can be realized by different properties in different domains of discourse. For instance, truths about empirical science might realize truth's function by corresponding to reality while truths about morality might do so by cohering with a larger set of propositions.

Lynch has also worked on epistemology, especially epistemological issues related to big data and democracy. Lynch argues for the importance of intellectual humility in democracy.

== Writing ==
Lynch is the author of Truth in Context (MIT Press, 1998), True to Life (MIT Press, 2004), Truth as One and Many (OUP, 2009), In Praise of Reason (MIT, 2012), The Internet of Us: Knowing More and Understanding Less in the Age of Big Data (Liveright Publishing, 2016), and Know-It-All-Society: Truth and Arrogance in Political Culture (Liveright Publishing, 2019), as well as many professional philosophical articles. He was editor of the volume The Nature of Truth: Classic and Contemporary Perspectives (Bradford Books, 2001), co-editor with Professor Heather Battaly of the volume Perspectives on the Philosophy of William P. Alston (Rowman & Littlefield, 2005), as well as co-editor with Professor Patrick Greenough of the volume Truth and Realism (OUP, 2006).

Lynch won the Orwell Award in 2019 for his book Know-It-All Society: Truth and Arrogance in Political Culture.
