= Minds and Machines =

- Discipline: Artificial intelligence, philosophy, cognitive science
- Language: English
- Edited by: Mariarosaria Taddeo

Publication details
- History: 1991–present
- Publisher: Springer Science+Business Media
- Frequency: Quarterly
- Impact factor: 7.4 (2022)

Standard abbreviations
- ISO 4: Minds Mach.

Indexing
- CODEN: MMACEO
- ISSN: 0924-6495 (print); 1572-8641 (web)
- LCCN: 91650998
- OCLC no.: 37915831

Links
- Journal homepage; Online access

Minds and Machines is a peer-reviewed academic journal covering artificial intelligence, philosophy, and cognitive science.

The journal was established in 1991 with James Henry Fetzer as founding editor-in-chief. It was published by Kluwer Academic Publishers but was taken over by Springer in 2021 (Springer Science+Business Media). The journal affiliates with the Society for Machines and Mentality, a special interest group within the International Association for Computing and Philosophy. The current editor-in-chief is Mariarosaria Taddeo (University of Oxford).

== Editors ==
Previous editors-in-chief of the journal have been James H. Fetzer (1991–2000), James H. Moor (2001–2010), and Gregory Wheeler (2011–2016).

== Abstracting and indexing ==
The journal is abstracted and indexed by the following services:

- Academic OneFile
- Academic Search
- EI/Compendex
- Inspec
- Neuroscience Citation Index
- ProQuest
- PsycINFO
- Science Citation Index Expanded
- Scopus
- The Philosopher's Index
- MLA Bibliography of Linguistic Literature

According to the Journal Citation Reports, the journal has a 2016 impact factor of 0.514.

== Controversies ==
Regarding the peer review conducted in 2025, it was revealed that Taddeo and Springer Nature had falsely told the author that the manuscript had been desk-rejected, although peer review had in fact been conducted. It was also revealed that Springer Nature's Research Integrity Director Chris Graf and its Data Protection Office had continuously pressured the author not to raise claims about the matter. Taddeo stated that "serious problems" had occurred with the executive editor who handled the submission, but the journal has not disclosed the specific nature of these problems.

== Article categories ==
The journal publishes articles in the categories Research articles, Reviews, Critical and discussion exchanges (debates), Letters to the Editor, and Book reviews.

== Frequently cited articles ==
According to the Web of Science, the following five articles have been cited most frequently:

- Edelman, S. (1995). "Representation, similarity, and the chorus of prototypes". Minds and Machines. 5: 45–68. doi:10.1007/BF00974189. S2CID 879875.
- Copeland, B. J. (2002). "Hypercomputation". Minds and Machines. 12 (4): 461–502. doi:10.1023/A:1021105915386. S2CID 218585685.
- Glymour, C. (1998). "Learning causes: Psychological explanations of causal explanation". Minds and Machines. 8: 39–60. doi:10.1023/A:1008234330618. S2CID 24720518.
- Floridi, L.; Sanders, J. W. (2004). "On the Morality of Artificial Agents". Minds and Machines. 14 (3): 349–379. doi:10.1023/B:MIND.0000035461.63578.9d. S2CID 5985008.
- Hadley, R. F.; Hayward, M. B. (1997). "Strong Semantic Systematicity from Hebbian Connectionist Learning". Minds and Machines. 7: 1–37. doi:10.1023/A:1008252408222. S2CID 8808083.
