= Android epistemology =

Study of machines' capacity for knowledge

Android epistemology is an approach to epistemology considering the space of possible machines and their capacities for knowledge, beliefs, attitudes, desires and for action in accord with their mental states. Thus, android epistemology incorporates artificial intelligence, computational cognitive psychology, computability theory and other related disciplines.

== See also ==
- Computational epistemology
- Formal epistemology
- Machine learning
- Philosophy of mind
