= Theory of knowledge (IB course) =

Compulsory International Baccalaureate subject

Theory of Knowledge (TOK) is a compulsory core subject of the International Baccalaureate Diploma Programme covering, for example, epistemological topics. It is marked on a letter scale (A-E) and aims to "provide an opportunity for students to reflect on the nature of knowledge, and on how we know what we claim to know." Students who attain an E will not be able to receive their final IB Diploma.

== Course description ==
Theory of Knowledge is a course created by the IB organization and must not be conceived as pure epistemology. This course involves a process of exploring and sharing students' views on "knowledge questions" (an umbrella term for "everything that can be approached from a TOK point of view"), so "there is no end to the valid questions that may arise", "there are many different ways to approach TOK," "the sheer scope of the TOK course is daunting" and "teachers and students need the confidence to go too far outside their traditional comfort zones." Teachers are entitled to select a teaching methodology and course material that will convey the theoretical foundation of essential concepts and may provide an environment in which these concepts can be discussed and debated. The focus of the discussion should not be the differentiation between "right" and "wrong" ideas but on the quality of justification and a balanced approach to the knowledge claim in question.

The TOK course uses a combination, in no particular order ("many entry points and sequences are possible"):

- Ways of knowing: (sense perception, reason, emotion, faith, imagination, intuition, memory, and language). Note that this is no longer mandatory in the new ToK course (first assessment 2022). How do we gain knowledge of the world, and what are the advantages and disadvantages of each way in which we learn of the world and our place in it. Until 2014, there were only four ways of knowing (sense perception, reason, emotion, and language, but the IB curriculum then changed to include four other ways of knowing: intuition, imagination, faith, and memory).
- Areas of knowledge (mathematics, natural sciences, human sciences, history, religious knowledge systems, indigenous knowledge systems, the arts and ethics): their distinct natures and methods of gaining knowledge, the types of claim each makes and the issues to consider (e.g., "How do you know that the scientific method is a valid method of gaining knowledge?", "What is the reason for having historical knowledge, and how is it applied in life?"). The IB originally had six areas of knowledge: mathematics, natural sciences, human sciences, history, the arts and ethics. In 2014, the IB curriculum changed to include two more areas of knowledge: religious knowledge systems and indigenous knowledge systems.
- Factors that transcend individual ways of knowing and areas of knowledge:
  - Nature of knowing: what are the differences between information, data, belief, faith, opinion, knowledge and wisdom?
  - Knowledge communities: what is taken for granted in a community? How can we decide which beliefs we ought to check further?
  - Knowers' perspective and applications of knowledge: how do age, education, culture and experience influence selection of sources and formation of knowledge claims? If you know something, or how to do something, do you have a responsibility to use your knowledge? By using different types of AOK (areas of knowledge) and WOK (ways of knowing) you can then start to write counterclaims and claims in different types of texts.
  - Justifications of knowledge claims: why should claims be assessed critically? Are logic, sensory perception, revelation, faith, memory, consensus, intuition, and self-awareness equally reliable justifications? Use of coherence, correspondence, pragmatism, and consensus as criteria of truth.

The TOK course is expected to involve 100 teaching hours over the two years of the Diploma Programme. Having followed the course, students should be competent to analyse knowledge claims and respond to knowledge issues in the context of different areas of knowledge and ways of knowing, expressing ideas accurately and honestly, using examples from their own experiences as learners and in outside life.

- Personal knowledge is the systematic assimilation of shared knowledge acquired in different areas of knowledge through a process that vary within disciplines.
- Shared knowledge is the accumulation of bodies of knowledge in different areas of knowledge, the media and society.
- The Knowledge Framework is a scheme that contains five elements: scope and application, language, methodology, historical development and links to personal knowledge.

== Assessment ==
In the past, Theory of Knowledge was assessed in two parts: an externally examined 1200- to 1600-word essay and an internally assessed presentation. As of 2022, this has been replaced with an exhibition. Each part is scored using assessment criteria, which differ between the essay and presentation. The total score is converted into a grade from A to E. A similar system is used for the Extended Essay. Students can gain up to 3 points for the diploma based on the grades achieved for TOK and EE. No diploma is awarded if a candidate fails to submit either the TOK essay or TOK exhibition, or receives grade E for either the Extended Essay or Theory of Knowledge.

IB Diploma Core Requirements - Awarded Points Matrix
	Theory of Knowledge					
Extended Essay
Extended Essay		A	B	C	D	E
Extended Essay	A	3	3	2	2	Failing condition
Extended Essay	B	3	2	2	1	Failing condition
Extended Essay	C	2	2	1	0	Failing condition
Extended Essay	D	2	1	0	0	Failing condition
Extended Essay	E	Failing condition				Failing condition
The diploma points matrix, as of May 2015

=== TOK essay ===
For each exam session, the IB prescribes six essay titles from which students must choose. Each title raises generic cross-disciplinary questions about knowledge, and the student is expected to consider the issues raised in the title and reach conclusions about them. The essay should put forward claims and counterclaims, linking knowledge issues to areas of knowledge and ways of knowing, and show evidence of original thinking by the student. Essays over the maximum word count of 1,600 are penalised with a one mark reduction, and any content beyond the 1600th word of the essay is not read by the examiner.

=== TOK presentation (Last exam 2021) ===
During the Theory of Knowledge course, students must plan and deliver at least one (as individuals or in small groups, each comprising a maximum of three students) presentation to the class. The topic is based on a real-life situation of interest to the student, e.g. "Reliability of media reporting of science", "What makes something a work of art?" and the presentation is expected to show why the topic is significant, linking it to a relevant main knowledge question (KQ), and discussing those issues and examining the implications of approaching the question from different perspectives, given by WOKs (ways of knowing), and at least one AOK (area of knowledge). Teachers have wide latitude to help with topic selection and identifying suitable approaches. About ten minutes should be allowed for each presenter.

=== TOK exhibition (First exam 2022) ===
The TOK exhibition is a new assessment component implemented for all the candidates graduating in 2022 and after. It replaces the TOK presentation and bears the same assessment weight (33%).

According to the 2022 IB Guide, the TOK exhibition explores how TOK manifests in the world around us by creating an exhibition of three objects (or images of objects) that connect to only one of the themes (either core or optional) and on only one of the 35 prompts provided within the new Guide. Each object must be accompanied by a written commentary. The total word count must be at most 950 words.

These 35 prompts are knowledge questions such as: What counts as knowledge? Who owns knowledge? Are some things unknowable? etc.
