= A Causal Theory of Knowing =

1967 essay by Alvin Goldman

"A Causal Theory of Knowing" is a philosophical essay written by Alvin Goldman in 1967, published in The Journal of Philosophy. It is based on existing theories of knowledge in the realm of epistemology, the study of philosophy through the scope of knowledge. The essay attempts to define knowledge by connecting facts, beliefs and knowledge through underlying and connective series called causal chains. It provides a causal theory of knowledge.

A causal chain is repeatedly described as a sequence of events for which one event in a chain causes the next. According to Goldman, these chains can only exist with the presence of an accepted fact, a belief in the fact, and a cause for the subject to believe the fact. The essay also explores the ideas of perception and memory through the use of the causal chains and the concept of knowledge.

== Background ==
The essay is regarded as an improvement and rebuttal of Edmund Gettier's "Is Justified True Belief Knowledge?", which is one of many attempts to explain the necessary conditions for knowledge to develop. Goldman implements the causal connection to reiterate his own theory of knowledge. Knowledge exists, says Goldman, if and only if the belief is justified by a reaction to the accepted fact.

Goldman's theory later counters that of Michael Clark, stating that his own theory including figures and diagrams is more appropriate than Clark's. "A Causal Theory of Knowing" uses figures which make explicit references to causal beliefs. Clark's model does not utilize these arrows, and Goldman states that the lack of these arrows deems Clark's model deficient.

== Author ==
Alvin Goldman, later a professor of philosophy at Rutgers University, wrote "A Causal Theory of Knowing" when he was in his late twenties. Goldman received his Ph.D. from Princeton University, and taught at numerous universities during his lifetime.

Goldman's research dealt mainly with epistemology and other cognitive sciences. "A Causal Theory of Knowing" was Goldman's first published paper explaining his own views of epistemology. Throughout his career, Goldman wrote more than ten essays focusing on knowledge and cognitive science.

== Contents ==
The essay starts with a definition of Gettier's theory, followed by multiple reiterations of the idea of causal connections, figures to explain knowledge through a visual perspective, and references to perception and memory through causal chains.

The essay tends to focus on examples in which knowledge or other sensations do not exist, rather than proving a certain fact to be known. Goldman also states on multiple occasions that he does not wish to explain the causal process in detail, instead pointing out counterexamples. At numerous times in the essay, he also points out that he does not intend to give definitive answers to each of the propositions mentioned.

Goldman also refocuses the idea of perception, or knowledge through sensation (specifically sight) using his own theory of knowing. The concept of causal perception indicates that one observes something only if the object itself causes the sensation of sight to be accepted as known. Thus, the object's existence must be factual and one must believe its existence. While all knowledge comes from facts, inferred knowledge emerges when physical object facts cause sense data which can be perceived as senses. The sense data can also be used to make conclusions, known as inferred knowledge, about certain physical object facts.

From "A Causal Theory of Knowing", Goldman constructs the idea that memory is also a causal process. Memory is explained as being an extension of knowledge into the future, and remembering is the act of recalling a fact that has already been known. Further, the theory states that if knowledge is forgotten at one time, it cannot be considered a memory in the future. According to Goldman, if a fact is known at Time 1 but forgotten at Time 2, and then at Time 3 that the fact is perceived again but not known, at Time 3 the original fact is not a memory because there is no causal connection between the fact and the memory.
