= Criteria of truth =

Standards and rules used to judge the accuracy of statements and claims

In epistemology, criteria of truth (or tests of truth) are standards and rules used to judge the accuracy of statements and claims. They are tools of verification, and as in the problem of the criterion, the reliability of these tools is disputed. Understanding a philosophy's criteria of truth is fundamental to a clear evaluation of that philosophy. This necessity is driven by the varying, and conflicting, claims of different philosophies. The rules of logic have no ability to distinguish truth on their own. An individual must determine what standards distinguish truth from falsehood. Not all criteria are equally valid. Some standards are sufficient, while others are questionable.

The criteria listed represent those most commonly used by scholars and the general public.

== Authority ==
The opinions of those with significant experience, highly trained or possessing an advanced degree are often considered a form of proof. Their knowledge and familiarity within a given field or area of knowledge command respect and allow their statements to be criteria of truth. A person may not simply declare themselves an authority, but rather must be properly qualified. Despite the wide respect given to expert testimony, it is not an infallible criterion. For example, multiple authorities may conflict in their claims and conclusions.

== Coherence ==
Coherence refers to a consistent and overarching explanation for all facts. To be coherent, all pertinent facts must be arranged in a consistent and cohesive fashion as an integrated whole. The theory that most effectively reconciles all facts in this fashion may be considered most likely to be true. Coherence is the most potentially effective test of truth because it most adequately addresses all elements. The main limitation lies not in the standard, but in the human inability to acquire all facts of an experience. Only an omniscient mind could be aware of all of the relevant information. A scholar must accept this limitation and accept as true the most coherent explanation for the available facts. Coherence is difficult to dispute as a criterion of truth, since arguing against coherence is validating incoherence, which is inherently illogical.

== Consensus gentium ==
Some view opinions held by all people to be valid criteria of truth. According to consensus gentium, the universal consent of all mankind (all humans holding a distinct belief), proves it is true. There is some value in the criterion if it means innate truth, such as the laws of logic and mathematics. If it merely means agreement, as in a unanimous vote, its value is questionable. For example, general assent once held that the sun revolved around the earth.

== Consistency (mere) ==
Mere consistency is when correct statements do not contradict, but are not necessarily related. Accordingly, an individual is consistent if he does not contradict himself. It is inadequate as a criterion because it treats facts in an isolated fashion without true cohesion and integration; nevertheless it remains a necessary condition for the truth of any argument, owing to the law of noncontradiction. The value of a proof largely lies in its ability to reconcile individual facts into a coherent whole.

== Consistency (strict) ==
Strict consistency is when claims are connected in such a fashion that one statement follows from another. Formal logic and mathematical rules are examples of rigorous consistency. An example would be: if all As are Bs and all Bs are Cs, then all As are Cs. While this standard is of high value, it is limited. For example, the premises are a priori (or self-apparent), requiring another test of truth to employ this criterion. Additionally, strict consistency may produce results lacking coherence and completeness. While a philosophical system may demonstrate rigorous consistency with the facts it considers, all facts must be taken into consideration for an adequate criterion of truth, regardless of their detriment to any given system.

== Correspondence ==
Correspondence is quite simply when a claim corresponds with its object. For example, the claim that the White House is in Washington, D.C. is true, if the White House is actually located in Washington. Correspondence is held by many philosophers to be the most valid of the criteria of truth. An idea that corresponds to its object is indeed true, but determining if the correspondence is perfect requires additional tests of truth. This indicates that correspondence is a perfectly valid definition of truth, but is not of itself a valid criterion of truth. An additional test beyond this "definition" is required to determine the precise degree of similarity between what is posited and what exists in objective reality. Establishing correspondence between what is posited and what exists is fraught with its own difficulties, see Map–territory relation.

== Custom ==
Most people consciously or unknowingly employ custom as a criterion of truth, based on the assumption that doing what is customary will prevent error. It is particularly applied in the determination of moral truth and reflected in the statement "when in Rome, do as the Romans do". People stick closely to the principle of custom when they use common vernacular, wear common fashions and so forth; essentially, when they do what is popular. Custom is not considered a serious, or valid, test of truth. For example, public opinion polls do not determine truth.

== Emotions ==
Many people allow feelings to determine judgment, often in the face of contrary evidence or without even attempting to collect evidence and facts. They are implicitly accepting emotions as a criterion of truth. Most people will admit that feelings are not an adequate test for truth. For example, a seasoned businessman will put aside his emotions and search for the best available facts when making an investment. Similarly, scholars are trained to put aside such subjective judgments when evaluating knowledge. Emotions are real, however, and thus must be considered within any social scientific system of coherence.

== Instinct ==
The existence of distinct instincts has long been debated. Proponents of instinct argue that we eat because of hunger, drink because of thirst, and so forth. Some have even argued for the existence of God based on this criterion, arguing that the object of every instinct has a referent in reality. The counterpoint of hunger is food; for thirst it is liquid; for the sex drive it is a mate. Instincts are not accepted as a reliable test because they are most often indistinct, variant and difficult to define. Additionally, universal instincts are so few that they offer little to the greater body of philosophy as a criterion.

== Intuition ==
Intuition is an assumed truth with an unknown, or possibly unexamined, source. It is a judgment that is not dependent on a rational examination of the facts. It is usually experienced as a sudden sensation and/or rush of thoughts that feel "right". Many persons experience intuitive epiphanies which later prove to be true. Scholars have sometimes come upon valid theories and proofs while daydreaming or otherwise mentally occupied with something bearing no apparent relationship to the truth they seek to reveal. Intuition is at best a source for truths, rather than a criterion with which to evaluate them. Intuitive knowledge requires testing by means of other criteria of truth in order to confirm its accuracy.

== Majority rule ==
Majority rule is a statistical method of accepting assertions and proposals. In democratic systems, majority rule is used to determine group decisions, particularly those relating to personal morality and social behavior. Some systems divided into several oppositional factions may depend on mere plurality. While majority rule may make for a good democratic system, it is a poor determinant of truth, subject to the criticisms of the broad version of consensus gentium.

== Naïve realism ==
Naïve realism posits that only that which is directly observable by the human senses is true. First-hand observation determines the truth or falsity of a given statement. Naïve Realism is an insufficient criterion of truth. A host of natural phenomena are demonstrably true, but not observable by the unaided sense. For example, Naïve Realism would deny the existence of sounds beyond the range of human hearing and the existence of x-rays. Similarly, there are a number of sense experiments which show a disconnect between the perceived sensation and the reality of its cause.

== Pragmatic ==
If an idea works then it must be true, to the Pragmatist. The consequences of applying a concept reveal its truth value upon examination of the results. The full meaning of an idea is self-apparent in its application. For example, the therapeutic value and effect of penicillin in relation to infections is proven in its administration. Although pragmatism is considered a valuable criterion, it must be used with caution and reservation, due to its potential for false positives. For example, a doctor may prescribe a patient medication for an illness, but it could later turn out that a placebo is equally effective. Thus, untrue concepts could appear to be working contrary to the purpose of the pragmatic test. However, it has validity as a test, particularly in the form William Ernest Hocking called "negative pragmatism". In essence, it states that ideas that do not work cannot possibly be true, though ideas which do work may or may not be true.

== Revelation ==
The principal distinction between intuition and revelation is that revelation has an assumed source: God (or another higher power). Revelation may be defined as truth emanating from God. Many religions fundamentally rely on revelation as a test of truth. This criterion is subject to the same criticisms as intuition. It may be a valid reference of truth for an individual, but it is inadequate for providing a coherent proof of the knowledge to others.

== Time ==
Time is a criterion commonly appealed to in debate, often referred to as "the test of time". This criterion posits that over time erroneous beliefs and logical errors will be revealed, while if the belief is true, the mere passage of time cannot adversely affect its validity. Time is an inadequate test for truth, since it is subject to similar flaws as custom and tradition (which are simply specific variations of the time factor). Many demonstrably false beliefs have endured for centuries and even millennia (e.g. vitalism). It is commonly rejected as a valid criterion. For example, most people will not convert to another faith simply because the other religion is centuries (or even millennia) older than their current beliefs.

== Tradition ==
Tradition, closely related to custom, is the standard stating that which is held for generations is true. Those accepting tradition argue that ideas gaining the loyalty multiple generations possesses a measure of credibility. Tradition possesses many of the same failings as custom. It is possible for falsehoods to be passed down from generation to generation, since tradition generally emphasizes repetition over critical evaluation.

== See also ==
- Anekantavada – Jain doctrine of many-sidedness
- Conceptual framework – Method of organizing information
- Contextualism – Topic of inquiry in philosophy and linguistics, also known as epistemic contextualism
- Degrees of truth – Concept in logic
- Exclusive disjunction – True when either but not both inputs are true
- Fallibilism – Philosophical principle
- False dilemma – Informal fallacy involving falsely limited alternatives
- Fuzzy logic – System for reasoning about vagueness
- List of cognitive biases
- Logical equality – Logical operator in propositional calculus
- Logical value – Value indicating the relation of a proposition to truth
- Multi-valued logic – Propositional calculus in which there are more than two truth values
- Münchhausen trilemma – Thought experiment used to demonstrate the impossibility of proving any truth
- Pluralist theories of truth
- Principle of bivalence – Classical logic of two values, either true or false
- Propositional logic – System of evaluating truth-based propositions in terms of binary logic
- Relativism – Philosophical view rejecting objectivity
