= Gregory Wheeler =

American computer scientist

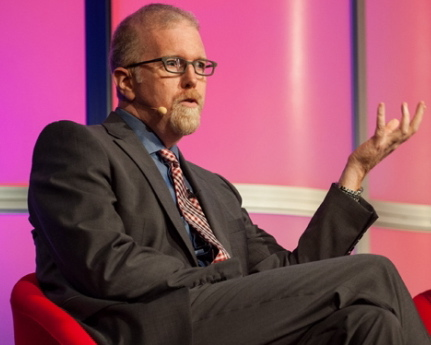
- Born: 1968 (age 57–58); Virginia, United States
- Education: University of Rochester
- Scientific career
- Fields: Philosophy; Computer Science
- Workplaces: Frankfurt School of Finance & Management; LMU Munich; New University of Lisbon
- Doctoral advisor: Henry E. Kyburg, Jr.

Gregory Wheeler (born 1968) is an American logician, philosopher, and computer scientist, who specializes in formal epistemology. Much of his work has focused on imprecise probability. He is currently Professor of Philosophy and Computer Science at the Frankfurt School of Finance and Management, and has held positions at LMU Munich and the New University of Lisbon. He is a member of the PROGIC steering committee, the editorial boards of Synthese, and Minds and Machines, and was the editor-in-chief of Minds and Machines from 2011 to 2016. In 2019 he co-founded Exaloan AG, a financial technology company based in Frankfurt. He obtained a Ph.D. in philosophy and computer science from the University of Rochester under Henry Kyburg.
