= Pluralist theories of truth =

A pluralist theory of truth is a theory of truth which posits that there may be more than one property that makes a proposition true.

== Overview ==
Most traditional theories of truth are monist: that is, they hold that there is one and only property the having of which makes a belief or proposition true. Pluralist theories of truth deny this assumption. According to pluralism, ethical propositions might be true by more than one property, for example by virtue of coherence; propositions about the physical world might also be true by corresponding to the objects and properties they are about. Pluralism, in short, holds out the prospect that propositions might be "true in more than one way".

Crispin Wright is the most well-known advocate of pluralism about truth. In his 1992 book Truth and Objectivity, Wright argued that any predicate which satisfied certain platitudes about truth qualified as a truth predicate. In some discourses, Wright argued, the role of the truth predicate might be played by the notion of superassertibility.

Michael P. Lynch has recently advocated a different type of pluralism about truth. In a series of articles and in his 2009 book Truth as One and Many Lynch argues that we should see truth as a functional property capable of being multiply manifested in distinct properties like correspondence or coherence.

== See also ==
- Criteria of truth
- Degrees of truth
