= Statistical Applications in Genetics and Molecular Biology =

- Discipline: Statistics
- Language: English
- Edited by: Michael P.H. Stumpf

Publication details
- History: 2002-present
- Publisher: de Gruyter
- Frequency: Bimonthly
- Open access: Delayed, after 12 months
- Impact factor: 1.717 (2012)

Standard abbreviations
- ISO 4: Stat. Appl. Genet. Mol. Biol.

Indexing
- CODEN: SAGMCU
- ISSN: 2194-6302 (print); 1544-6115 (web)
- OCLC no.: 859021152

Links
- Journal homepage

Statistical Applications in Genetics and Molecular Biology is a bimonthly peer-reviewed scientific journal covering the application of statistics to problems in computational biology. It was established in 2002 and is published by de Gruyter. The editor-in-chief is Guido Sanguinetti. According to the Journal Citation Reports, the journal has a 2012 impact factor of 1.717.

== Abstracting and indexing ==
The journal is abstracted and indexed in:

- Current Index to Statistics
- MEDLINE
- Science Citation Index Expanded
- Zentralblatt MATH
