= Formal epistemology =

Theoretical study of knowledge

Formal epistemology uses formal methods from decision theory, logic, probability theory and computability theory to model and reason about issues of epistemological interest. Work in this area spans several academic fields, including philosophy, computer science, economics, and statistics. The focus of formal epistemology has tended to differ somewhat from that of traditional epistemology, with topics like uncertainty, induction, and belief revision garnering more attention than the analysis of knowledge, skepticism, and issues with justification. Formal epistemology is an epistemology in the sense of studying the quantitiative nature of what is known and believed and how, whereas traditional epistemology seeeks to understand why we (believe we) know what we know, what the meaning of "knowledge" exactly is, and the ramifications of those assumptions.

== History ==
Though formally oriented epistemologists have been laboring since the emergence of formal logic and probability theory (if not earlier), only recently have they been organized under a common disciplinary title. This gain in popularity may be attributed to the organization of yearly Formal Epistemology Workshops by Branden Fitelson and Sahotra Sarkar, starting in 2004, and the PHILOG-conferences starting in 2002 (The Network for Philosophical Logic and Its Applications) organized by Vincent F. Hendricks. Carnegie Mellon University's Philosophy Department hosts an annual summer school in logic and formal epistemology. In 2010, the department founded the Center for Formal Epistemology.

== Bayesian epistemology ==
Bayesian epistemology is an important theory in the field of formal epistemology. It has its roots in Thomas Bayes' work in the field of probability theory. It is based on the idea that beliefs are held gradually and that the strengths of the beliefs can be described as subjective probabilities. As such, they are subject to the laws of probability theory, which act as the norms of rationality. These norms can be divided into static constraints, governing the rationality of beliefs at any moment, and dynamic constraints, governing how rational agents should change their beliefs upon receiving new evidence. The most characteristic Bayesian expression of these principles is found in the form of Dutch books, which illustrate irrationality in agents through a series of bets that lead to a loss for the agent no matter which of the probabilistic events occurs. Bayesians have applied these fundamental principles to various epistemological topics but Bayesianism does not cover all topics of traditional epistemology. The problem of confirmation in the philosophy of science, for example, can be approached through the Bayesian principle of conditionalization by holding that a piece of evidence confirms a theory if it raises the likelihood that this theory is true. Various proposals have been made to define the concept of coherence in terms of probability, usually in the sense that two propositions cohere if the probability of their conjunction is higher than if they were neutrally related to each other. The Bayesian approach has also been fruitful in the field of social epistemology, for example, concerning the problem of testimony or the problem of group belief. Bayesianism still faces various theoretical objections that have not been fully solved.

== Topics ==
Formal epistemology research encompasses a range of topics unified by their synthesis of formal mathematical tools with epistemological analysis. Areas of study include Ampliative inference, including inductive logic and decision theory; Belief revision theory, which models how rational agents update their reasoning with external feedback; Game theory and foundations of probability and statistics. Other related topics include algorithmic learning theory and computational epistemology, as well as formal models of epistemic states, like belief and uncertainty, formal theories of coherentism and confirmation, and formal approaches to paradoxes of belief and/or action.

== Applications ==
Research in formal epistemology draws on tools from several formal disciplines. Decision theory and subjective expected utility, developed from the likes of Savage (1954) and Jeffrey (1965), both provide mathematical models of rational choice and belief updating. These tools are applied in contemporary formal epistemology research to analyze belief revision, coherence, and action under uncertainty.

Epistemic logic, as developed in multi-agent systems research, models belief, information, and knowledge flow. Formal epistemology employs Bayesian probabilistic methods, foundational to modern artificial intelligence and machine learning, to study inductive inference, confirmation, and uncertainty models.

== Contemporary formal epistemologists ==
Contemporary contributors to formal epistemology include Joseph Halpern, Sven Ove Hansson, Gilbert Harman, Vincent F. Hendricks, Richard Jeffrey, Isaac Levi, Daniel Osherson, Rohit Parikh, John L. Pollock, Bas Van Fraassen, and Gregory Wheeler.

== See also ==
- Algorithmic learning theory
- Belief revision
- Computability theory
- Computational learning theory
- Game theory
- Inductive logic

== Bibliography ==
- Arlo-Costa, H, van Benthem, J. and Hendricks, V. F. (eds.) (2012). A Formal Epistemology Reader. Cambridge: Cambridge University Press.
- Bovens, L. and Hartmann, S. (2003). Bayesian Epistemology. Oxford: Oxford University Press.
- Brown, B. (2017). Thoughts and Ways of Thinking: Source Theory and Its Applications. London: Ubiquity Press. .
- Hendricks, V. F. (2001). The Convergence of Scientific Knowledge: A View from The Limit. Dordrect: Kluwer Academic Publishers.
- Hendricks, V. F. (2006). Mainstream and Formal Epistemology. New York: Cambridge University Press.
- Hendricks, V. F. (ed.) (2006). Special issue on “8 Bridges Between Mainstream and Formal Epistemology”, Philosophical Studies.
- Hendricks, V. F. (ed.) (2006). Special issue on “Ways of Worlds I-II”, Studia Logica.
- Hendricks, V.F. and Pritchard, D. (eds.) (2006). New Waves in Epistemology. Aldershot: Ashgate.
- Hendricks, V. F. and Symons, J. (eds.) (2005). Formal Philosophy. New York: Automatic Press / VIP.
- Hendricks, V. F. and Symons, J. (eds.) (2006). Masses of Formal Philosophy. New York: Automatic Press / VIP.
- Hendricks, V. F. and Hansen, P.G. (eds.) (2007). Game Theory: 5 Questions. New York: Automatic Press / VIP.
- Hendricks, V.F. and Symons, J. (2006). Epistemic Logic. The Stanford Encyclopedia of Philosophy, Stanford. CA: USA.
- Wolpert, D.H., (1996) The lack of a priori distinctions between learning algorithms, Neural Computation, pp. 1341–1390.
- Wolpert, D.H., (1996) The existence of a priori distinctions between learning algorithms, Neural Computation, pp. 1391–1420.
- Wolpert, D.H., (2001) Computational capabilities of physical systems. Physical Review E, 65(016128).
- Zhu, H.Y. and R. Rohwer, (1996) No free lunch for cross-validation, pp. 1421– 1426.
