= Mathematical sciences =

Group of areas of study that are primarily mathematical

The mathematical sciences are a group of areas of study that includes, in addition to mathematics, those academic disciplines that are primarily mathematical in nature but may not be universally considered subfields of mathematics proper.

Statistics, for example, is mathematical in its methods but grew out of bureaucratic and scientific observations, which merged with inverse probability and then grew through applications in some areas of physics, biometrics, and the social sciences to become its own separate, though closely allied, field. Theoretical astronomy, theoretical physics, theoretical and applied mechanics, continuum mechanics, mathematical chemistry, actuarial science, computer science, computational science, data science, operations research, quantitative biology, control theory, econometrics, geophysics and mathematical geosciences are likewise other fields often considered part of the mathematical sciences.

Some institutions offer degrees in mathematical sciences (e.g. the United States Military Academy, Stanford University, and University of Khartoum) or applied mathematical sciences (for example, the University of Rhode Island).

== See also ==
- Exact sciences – Sciences that admit of absolute precision in their results
- Formal science – Study of abstract structures described by formal systems
- Relationship between mathematics and physics
