= TPCIT =

Tashkent Professional College of Information Technologies (TPCIT)
- Toshkent Axborot Texnologiyalari kasb- hunar Kolleji
- Type: College
- Established: 1940
- Director: Shin A.V.
- Students: about 2500
- Location: (Uzbekistan) Tashkent, Uzbekistan
- Website: http://www.tpkit.uz

TPCIT (Tashkent Professional College of Information Technologies) is one of the oldest educational institutions in Uzbekistan.

== Directions of education ==
The college conducts the training of specialist in 3 directions:

- Informatics and Information Technologies
- Telecommunications
- Accounting

== Chairs ==
- Department of Humanities
- Department of Foreign Languages
- Department of Social Sciences
- Department of Natural Mathematical Sciences
- Department of Information Technologies
- Department of Programming
- Department of Telecommunications
- Department of Economic Subjects
- Department of Initial Pre-Conscription Training for Youth
- Department of Physical Education
