= Relationship between chemistry and physics =

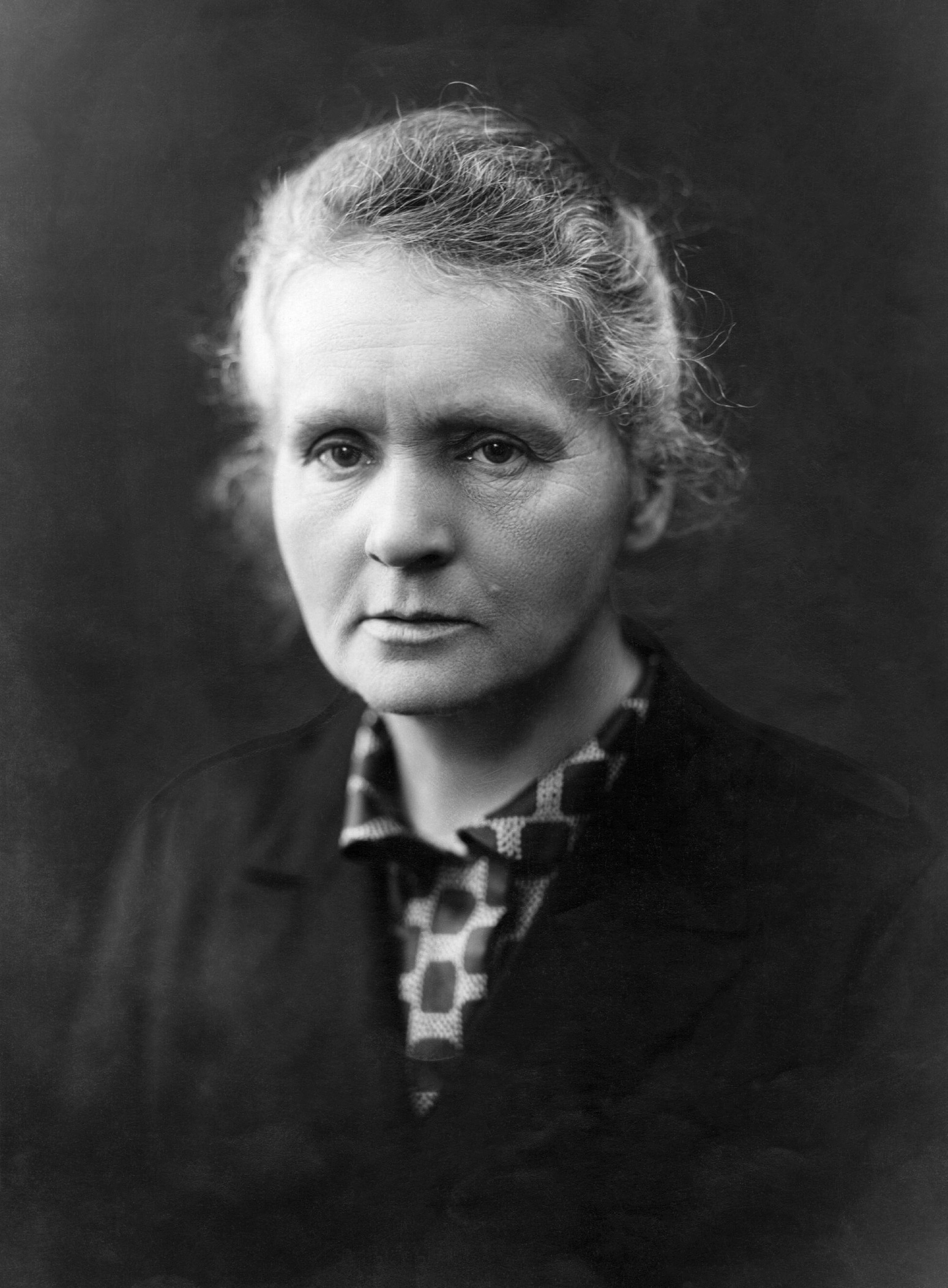
Marie Curie is the only individual to be awarded Nobel Prizes in both chemistry and physics

The relationship between chemistry and physics is a topic of debate in the philosophy of science. The issue is a complicated one, since both physics and chemistry are divided into multiple subfields, each with their own goals. A major theme is whether, and in what sense, chemistry can be said to "reduce" to physics.

== Background ==
Although physics and chemistry are branches of science that both study matter, they differ in the scopes of their respective subjects. While physics focuses on phenomena such as force, motion, electromagnetism, elementary particles, and spacetime, chemistry is concerned mainly with the structure and reactions of atoms and molecules, but does not necessarily deal with non-baryonic matter. However, the two disciplines overlap in subjects concerning the behaviour of fluids, the thermodynamics of chemical reactions, the magnetic forces between atoms and molecules, and quantum chemistry. Moreover, the laws of chemistry highly depend on the laws of quantum mechanics.

== Material science ==
In some respects the two sciences have developed independently, but less so towards the end of the twentieth century. There are many areas where there is major overlap, for instance both chemical physics and physical chemistry combine the two, while materials science is an interdisciplinary area which combines both as well as some elements of engineering. This was deliberate, as recognized by the National Academies of Sciences, Engineering, and Medicine, there are limitations to trying to force science into categories rather than focusing on the issues of importance, an approach now common in materials science.

== Historical views ==
In the 19th century, Georg Wilhelm Friedrich Hegel in his Encyclopaedia of the Philosophical Sciences in Basic Outline classifies natural sciences by putting physics and chemistry together but separating the two from mechanics. Later, Auguste Comte in his hierarchy of the sciences, classified chemistry as more dependent than physics, as chemistry requires physics.

In 1958, Paul Oppenheim and Hilary Putnam put forward the idea that in the 20th century chemistry has been reduced to physics, as evidence for the unity of science.

Pierre-Gilles de Gennes, Nobel laureate in Physics for his works on polymer physics and soft matter, criticized Comte's positivism in 1994, pointing it as the source of contempt for chemistry and other practical sciences among French scientists.

== Physicists and Nobel Prizes in Chemistry ==
The overlap between the chemistry and physics has led various physicists to earn the Nobel Prize in Chemistry. Marie Curie is known for being the only scientist to have been awarded both the Nobel Prize in Physics (1903) and in Chemistry (in 1911). Ernest Rutherford, known for the Rutherford scattering experiments that revealed the internal structure of the atom, was surprised to have been awarded the Nobel Prize in Chemistry in 1908, during the Nobel banquet he said:

I have dealt with many different transformations with various periods of time, but the quickest that I have met was my own transformation in one moment from a physicist to a chemist.

In 1968, Lars Onsager won the Nobel Prize in Chemistry for the thermodynamics of irreversible processes. After the news, a journalist announced it to Onsager's wife by telephone. She asked, "In physics or chemistry?" given her husband's contributions to both fields.

Walter Kohn, who won the 1998 Nobel Prize in Chemistry for the development of density functional theory, remarked that he never took a course in chemistry.

== See also ==
- Relationship between mathematics and physics
