= Physics =

Scientific field of study

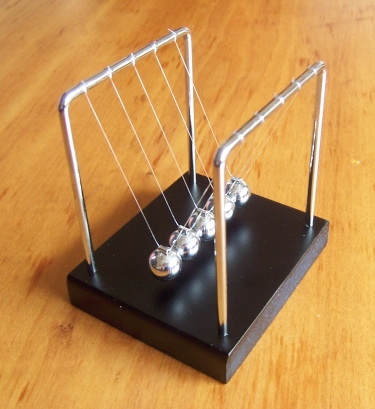
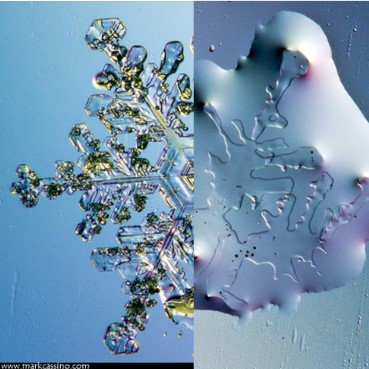
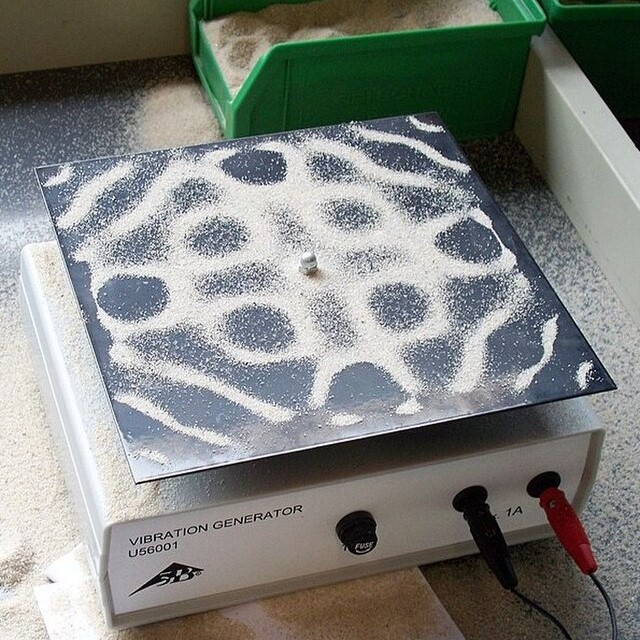
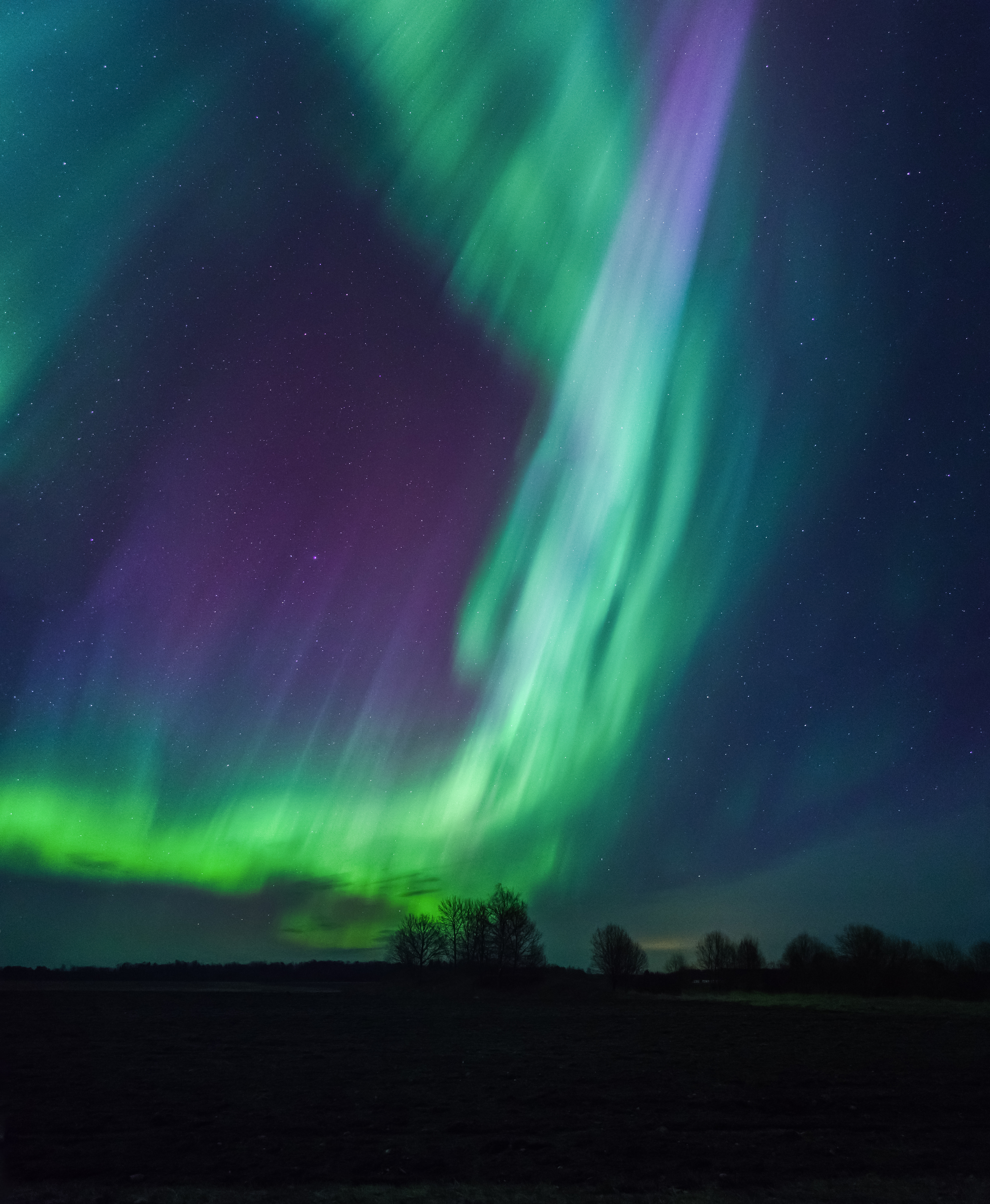
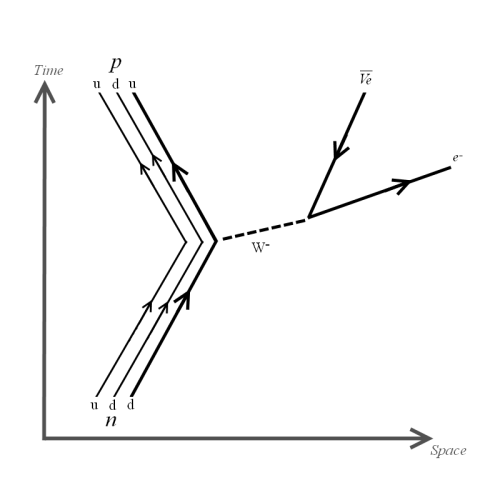
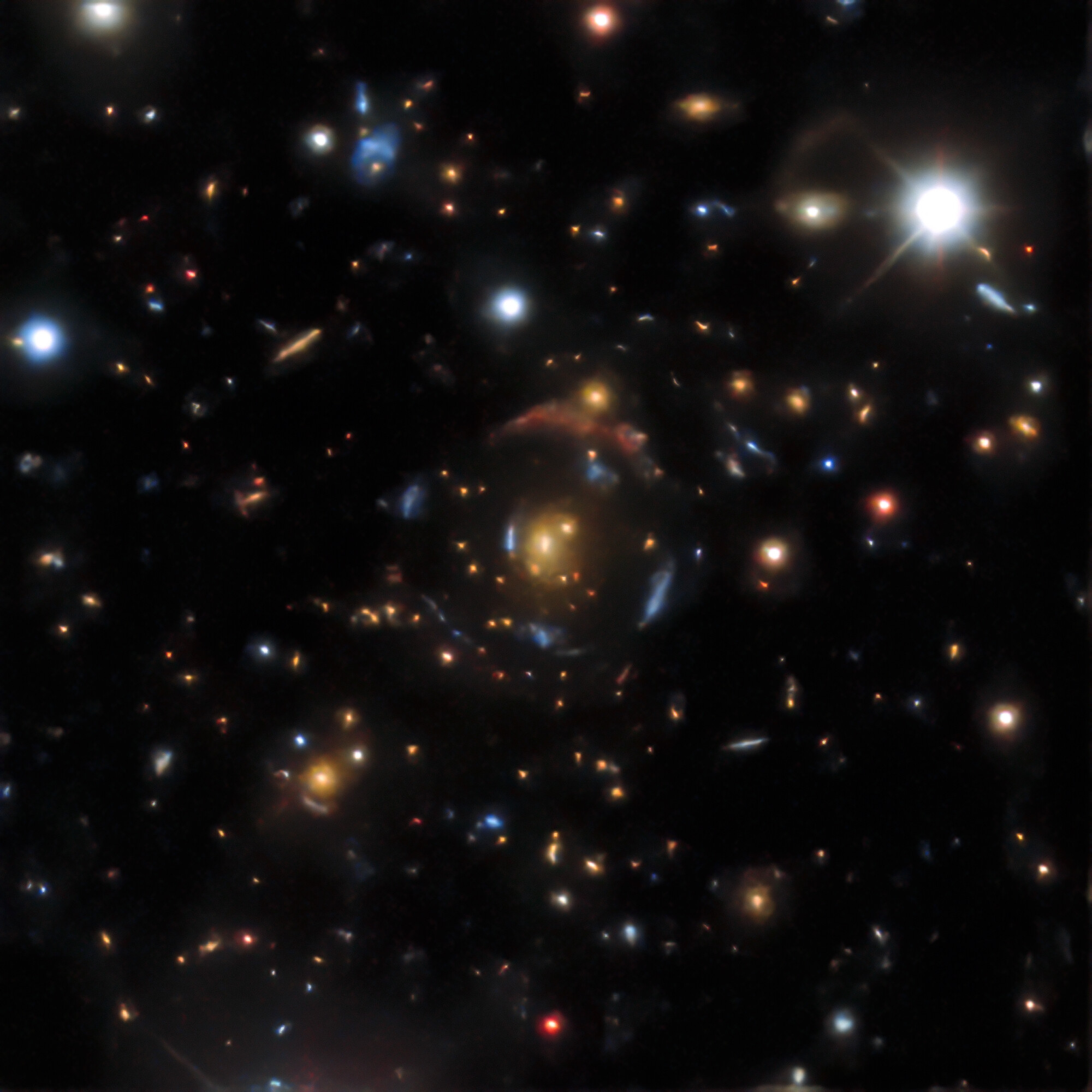
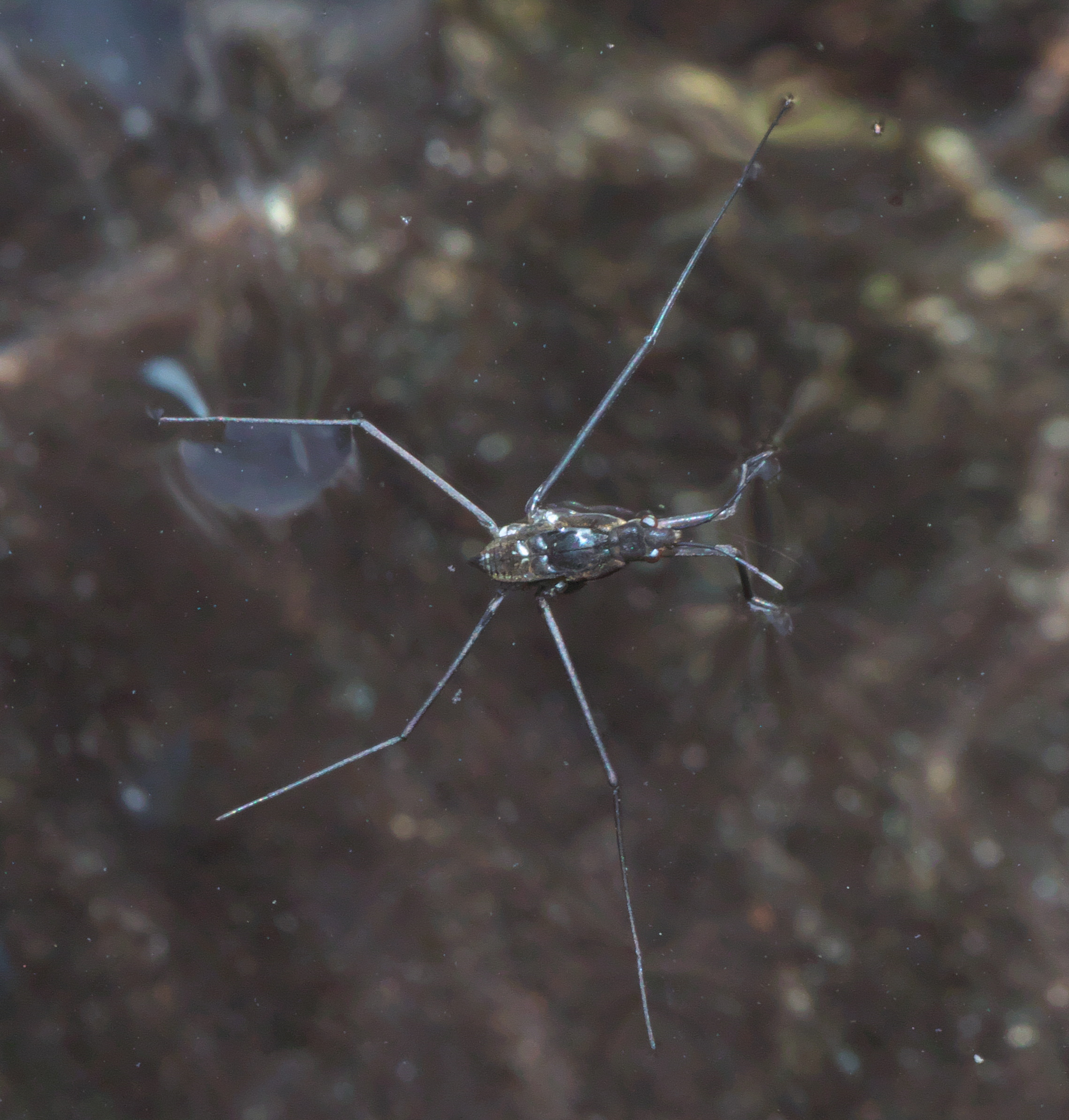
Phenomena and processes of physics’ various domains, clockwise from the upper left: (Note: Information regarding the images in the footer was trimmed, the full descriptions are below: Mechanics: a photo of a Newton's cradle, which, when in motion, demonstrates the conservation laws of momentum and energy in classical mechanics.; Thermodynamics: a diptych showing a snowflake before (left) and during (right) melting, illustrating the increase in entropy through the visible loss of structural order and morphological specificity, thereby widening the range of possible microstates (i.e. $S = k \ln W$).; Waves, Oscillations & Acoustics: perturbations propagating through a Chladni plate, forming standing wave patterns where resonance causes the sand on the plate to arrange in geometric figures.; Electromagnetism & Geophysics: the aurora borealis, a natural phenomenon involving the behaviour of charged particles in Earth's magnetosphere.; Fluid mechanics & Biophysics: a water strider using water’s surface tension to move across a pond.; Astrophysics, Relativity & Optics: an astrophotograph distorted by gravitational lensing, a relativistic effect—common in cosmic environments—in which the gravitational interaction indirectly alters the paths of photons.; Quantum mechanics: a diagrammatic representation of the double‑slit experiment, illustrating wave‑particle duality. Particles passing through two slits and impinging on a surface produce an interference pattern exemplifying their wave-like behaviour.; Particle physics & Nuclear physics: a Feynman diagram representing beta decay.; These are just some of the many branches of physics. Others include (but are not limited to): continuum mechanics, condensed matter physics, plasma physics, statistical mechanics, medical physics, cosmology, quantum field theory, astroparticle physics and more.) a Newton's cradle (classical mechanics), entropic changes in a snowflake (thermodynamics), a Chladni figure (waves, oscillations & acoustics), the aurora borealis (geophysics & electromagnetism), an insect floating across a pond (fluid mechanics & biophysics), gravitational lensing (astrophysics, optics & relativity), the double-slit experiment (quantum mechanics), and a Feynman diagram of beta decay (nuclear physics & particle physics).

Physics is the scientific study of matter, its fundamental constituents, its motion and behavior through space and time, and the related entities of energy and force. It is one of the most fundamental scientific disciplines. A scientist who specializes in the field of physics is called a physicist.

Physics is one of the oldest academic disciplines. Over much of the past two millennia, physics, chemistry, biology, and certain branches of mathematics were part of natural philosophy, but during the Scientific Revolution in the 17th century, these natural sciences branched into separate research endeavors. Physics intersects with many interdisciplinary areas of research, such as biophysics and quantum chemistry, and the boundaries of physics are not rigidly defined. New ideas in physics often explain the fundamental mechanisms studied by other sciences and suggest new avenues of research in these and other academic disciplines, such as mathematics and philosophy.

Advances in physics often enable new technologies. For example, advances in the understanding of electromagnetism, solid-state physics, and nuclear physics led directly to the development of technologies that have transformed modern society, such as television, computers, domestic appliances, and nuclear weapons; advances in thermodynamics led to the development of industrialization; and advances in mechanics inspired the development of calculus.

== History ==
The word physics comes from the Latin physica ('study of nature'), which itself is a borrowing of the Greek φυσική (phusikḗ 'natural science'), a term derived from φύσις (phúsis 'origin, nature, property').

=== Ancient astronomy ===
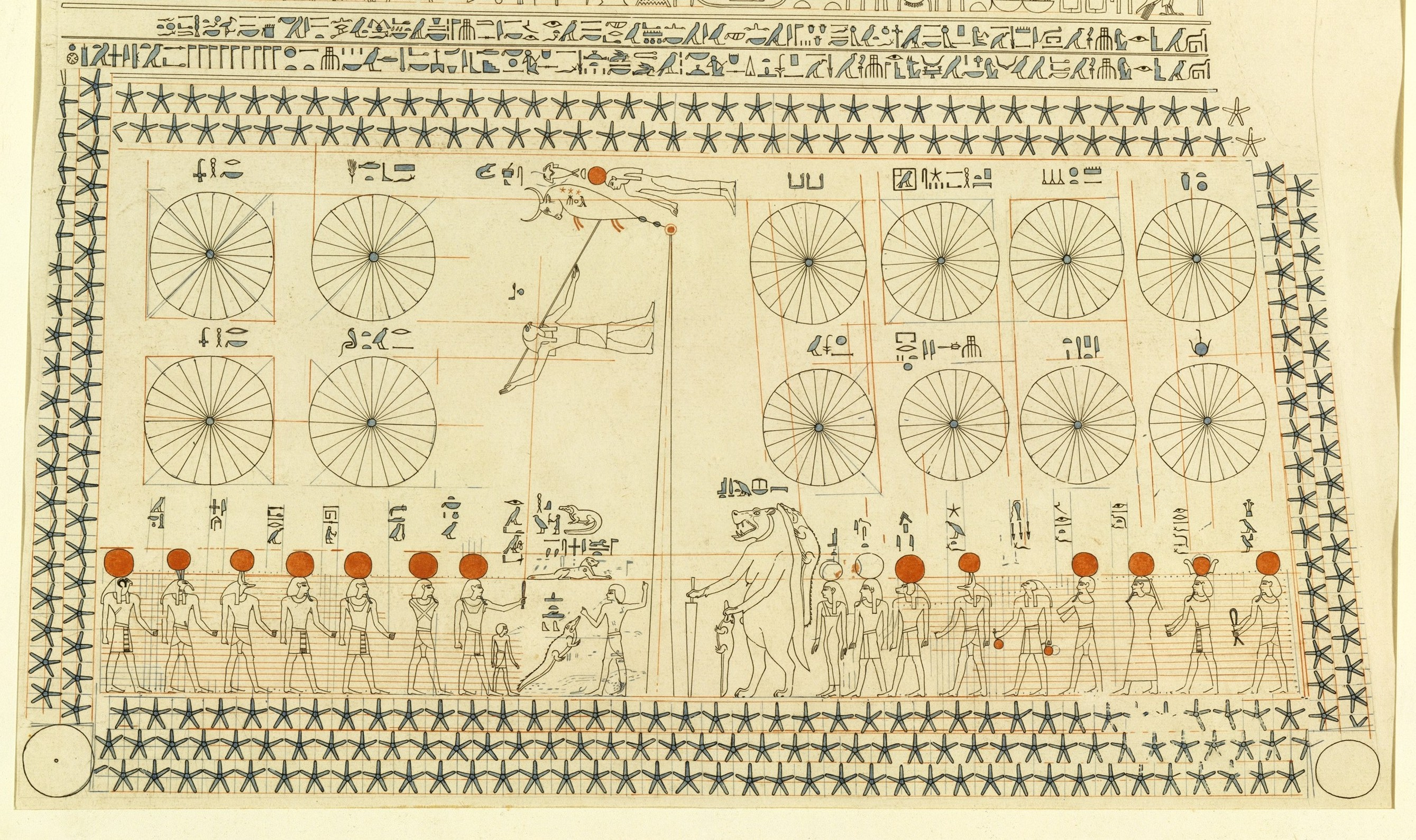
Ancient Egyptian astronomy is evident in monuments like the ceiling of Senemut's tomb from the Eighteenth Dynasty of Egypt.

Astronomy is one of the oldest natural sciences. Early civilizations dating before 3000 BCE, such as the Sumerians, ancient Egyptians, and the Indus Valley Civilization, had a predictive knowledge and a basic awareness of the motions of the Sun, Moon, and stars. The stars and planets, believed to represent gods, were often worshipped. While the explanations for the observed positions of the stars were often unscientific and lacking in evidence, these early observations laid the foundation for later astronomy, as the stars were found to traverse great circles across the sky, which could not explain the positions of the planets.

According to Asger Aaboe, the origins of Western astronomy can be found in Mesopotamia, and all Western efforts in the exact sciences are descended from late Babylonian astronomy. Egyptian astronomers left monuments showing knowledge of the constellations and the motions of the celestial bodies, while Greek poet Homer wrote of various celestial objects in his Iliad and Odyssey; later Greek astronomers provided names, which are still used today, for most constellations visible from the Northern Hemisphere.

=== Natural philosophy ===
Natural philosophy has its origins in Greece during the Archaic period (650 BCE – 480 BCE), when pre-Socratic philosophers like Thales rejected non-naturalistic explanations for natural phenomena and proclaimed that every event had a natural cause. They proposed ideas verified by reason and observation, and many of their hypotheses proved successful in experiment; for example, atomism was found to be correct approximately 2000 years after it was proposed by Leucippus and his pupil Democritus.

=== Aristotle and Hellenistic physics ===
Aristotle (384–322 BCE)

During the classical period in Greece (6th, 5th and 4th centuries BCE) and in Hellenistic times, natural philosophy developed along many lines of inquiry. Aristotle (Greek: Ἀριστοτέλης, Aristotélēs) (384–322 BCE), a student of Plato, wrote on many subjects, including a substantial treatise on "Physics" – in the 4th century BC. Aristotelian physics was influential for about two millennia. His approach mixed some limited observation with logical deductive arguments, but did not rely on experimental verification of deduced statements. Aristotle's foundational work in Physics, though very imperfect, formed a framework against which later thinkers further developed the field. His approach is entirely superseded today.

He explained ideas such as motion (and gravity) with the theory of four elements. Aristotle believed that each of the four classical elements (air, fire, water, earth) had its own natural place. Because of their differing densities, each element will revert to its own specific place in the atmosphere. So, because of their weights, fire would be at the top, air underneath fire, then water, then lastly earth. He also stated that when a small amount of one element enters the natural place of another, the less abundant element will automatically go towards its own natural place. For example, if there is a fire on the ground, the flames go up into the air in an attempt to go back into its natural place where it belongs. His laws of motion included: that heavier objects will fall faster, the speed being proportional to the weight and the speed of the object that is falling depends inversely on the density object it is falling through (e.g. density of air). He also stated that, when it comes to violent motion (motion of an object when a force is applied to it by a second object), the speed that object moves will only be as fast or strong as the measure of force applied to it. The problem of motion and its causes was studied carefully, leading to the philosophical notion of a "prime mover" as the ultimate source of all motion in the world (Book 8 of his treatise Physics).

=== Medieval European and Islamic ===
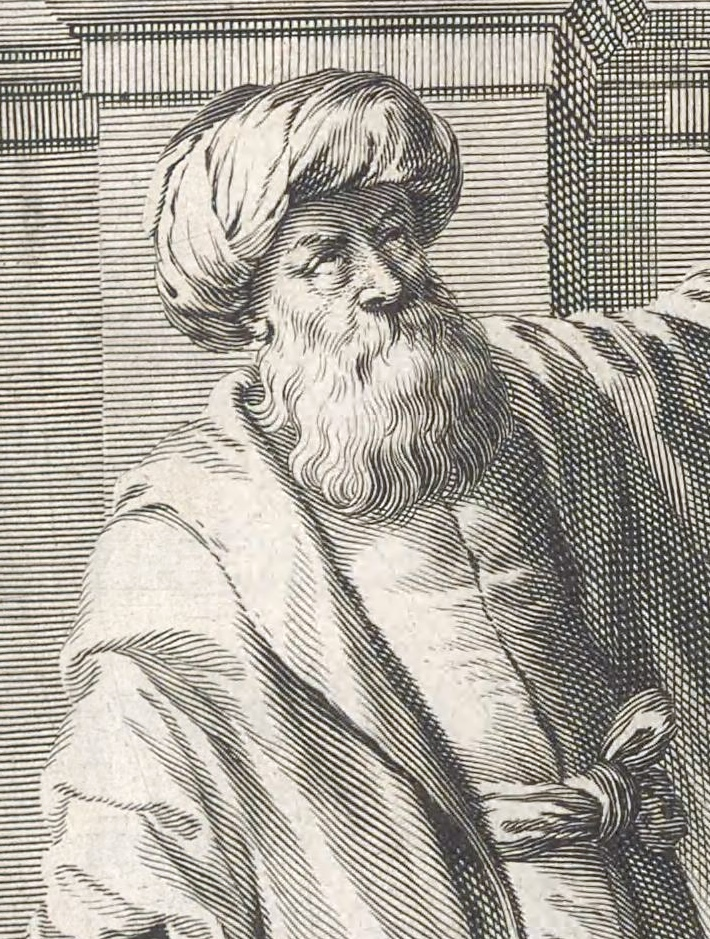
Ibn al-Haytham (c. 965 – c. 1040) wrote of his camera obscura experiments in the Book of Optics.

The Western Roman Empire fell to invaders and internal decay in the fifth century, resulting in a decline in intellectual pursuits in western Europe. By contrast, the Eastern Roman Empire (usually known as the Byzantine Empire) resisted the attacks from invaders and continued to advance various fields of learning, including physics. In the sixth century, John Philoponus challenged the dominant Aristotelian approach to science although much of his work was focused on Christian theology.

In the sixth century, Isidore of Miletus created an important compilation of Archimedes' works that are copied in the Archimedes Palimpsest. Islamic scholarship inherited Aristotelian physics from the Greeks and during the Islamic Golden Age developed it further.

The most notable innovations under Islamic scholarship were in the field of optics and vision, which came from the works of many scientists like Ibn Sahl, Al-Kindi, Ibn al-Haytham, Al-Farisi and Avicenna. In his Book of Optics (also known as Kitāb al-Manāẓir) Ibn al-Haytham presented the idea of light rays as an alternative to the ancient Greek idea about visual rays. Like Ptolemy, Ibn al-Haytham applied controlled experiments, verifying the laws of refraction and reflection with the new concept of light rays, but still lacking the concept of image formation.

The basic way camera obscura works

=== Scientific Revolution ===
Physics became a separate science when early modern Europeans used experimental and quantitative methods to discover what are now considered to be the laws of physics.

Major developments in this period include the replacement of the geocentric model of the Solar System with the heliocentric Copernican model, the laws governing the motion of planetary bodies (determined by Johannes Kepler between 1609 and 1619), Galileo's pioneering work on telescopes and observational astronomy in the 16th and 17th centuries, and Isaac Newton's discovery and unification of the laws of motion and universal gravitation (that would come to bear his name). Newton, and separately Gottfried Wilhelm Leibniz, developed calculus, the mathematical study of continuous change, and Newton applied it to solve physical problems.

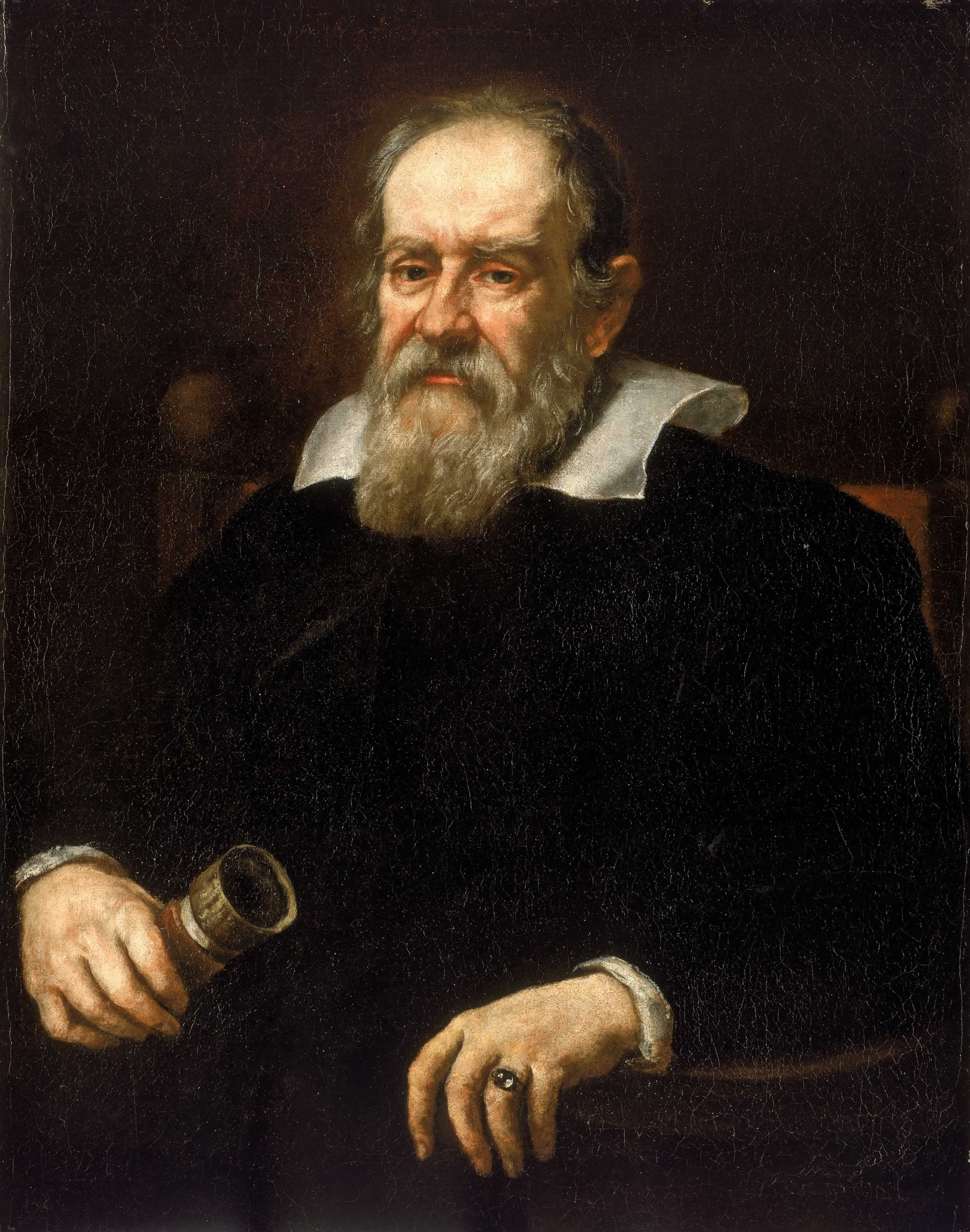
Galileo Galilei (1564–1642) related mathematics, theoretical physics, and experimental physics.

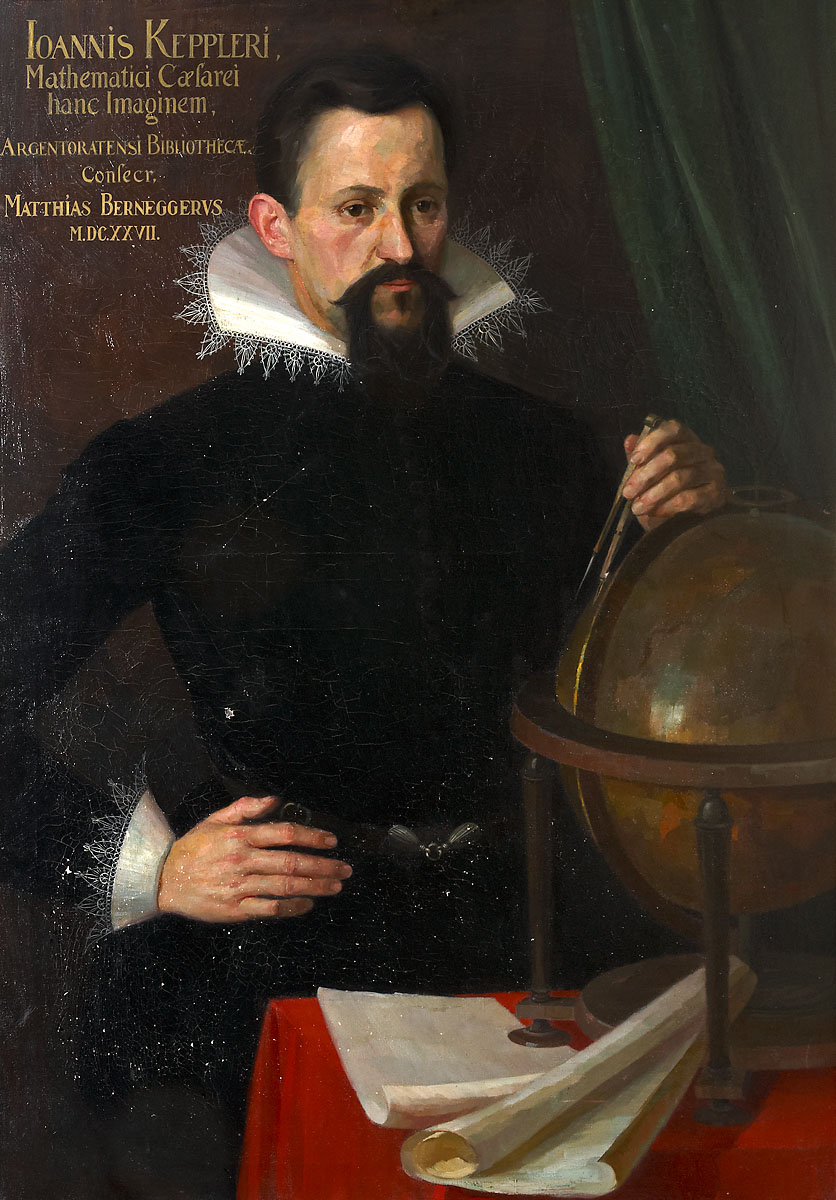
Johannes Kepler (1571–1630) explained planetary motions, formulating the first "natural laws" in the modern sense.

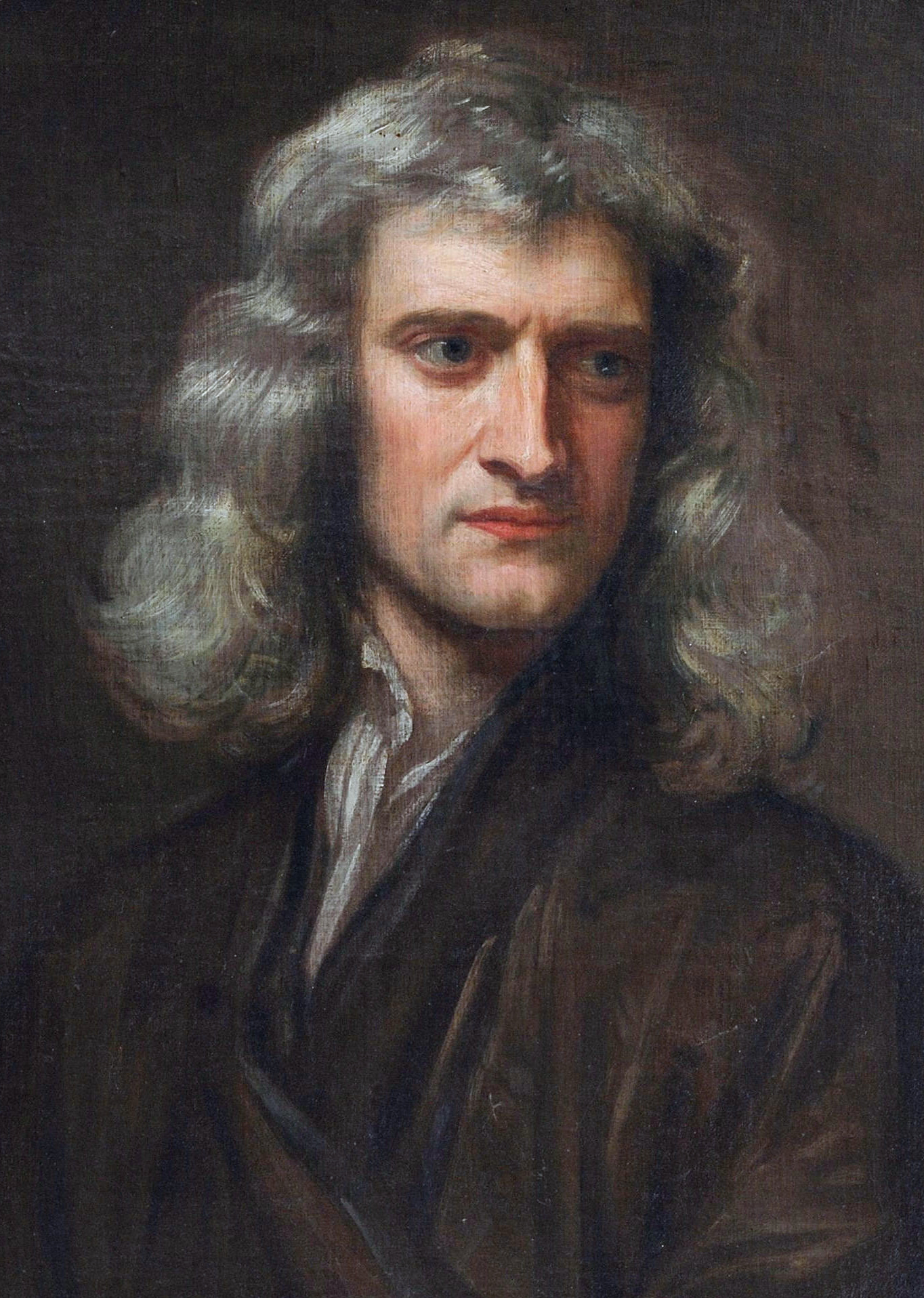
Isaac Newton (1643–1727) discovered the laws of motion and universal gravitation.

=== 19th century ===
The discovery of laws in thermodynamics, chemistry, and electromagnetics resulted from research efforts during the Industrial Revolution as energy needs increased. By the end of the 19th century, theories of thermodynamics, mechanics, and electromagnetics matched a wide variety of observations. Taken together these theories became the basis for what would later be called classical physics.

A few experimental results remained inexplicable. Classical electromagnetism presumed a medium, an luminiferous aether to support the propagation of waves, but this medium could not be detected. The intensity of light from hot glowing blackbody objects did not match the predictions of thermodynamics and electromagnetism. The character of electron emission of illuminated metals differed from predictions. These failures, seemingly insignificant in the big picture would upset the physics world in first two decades of the 20th century.

=== 20th century ===
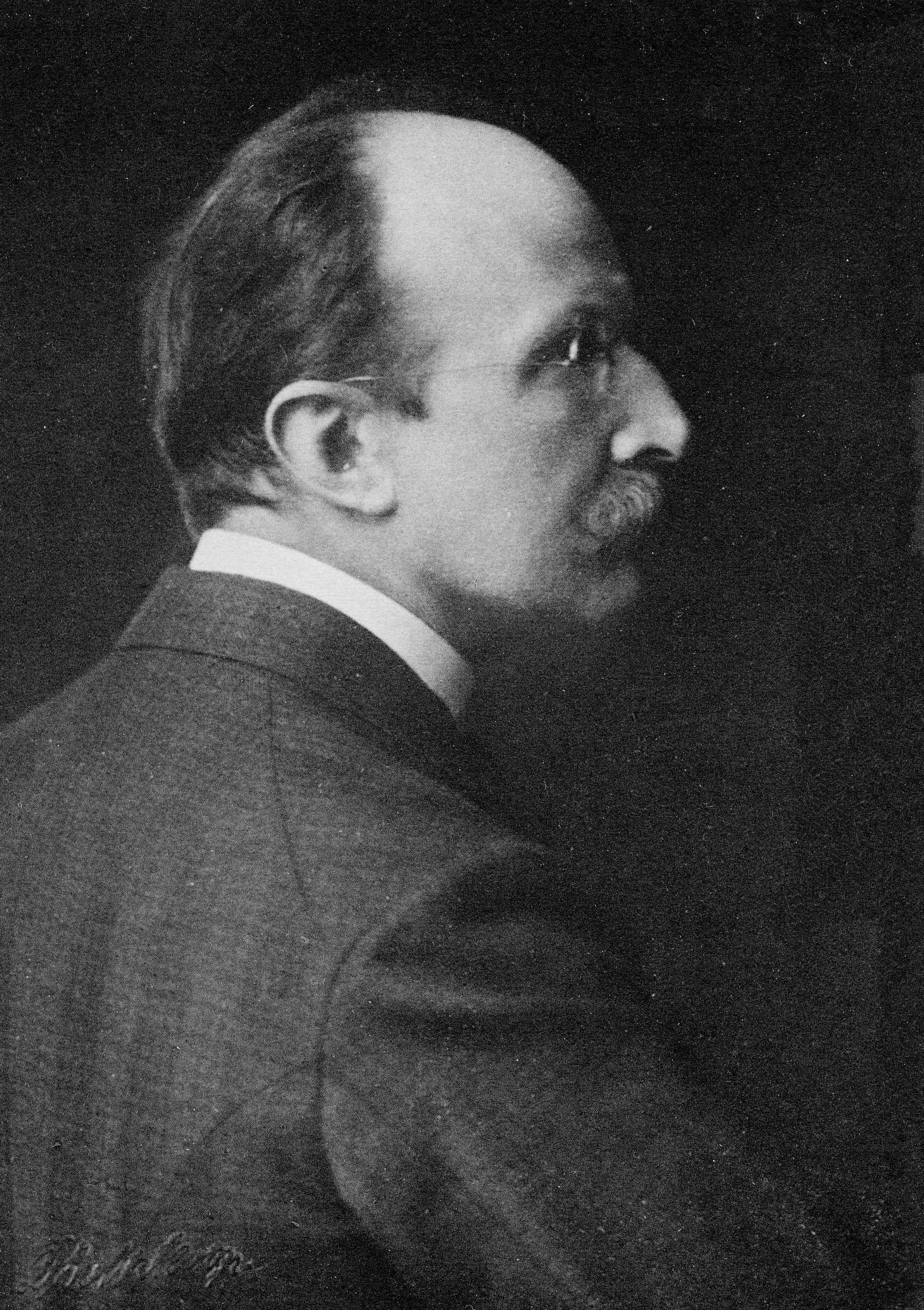
Max Planck (1858–1947) proposed quanta to explain the blackbody spectrum, originating quantum theory.

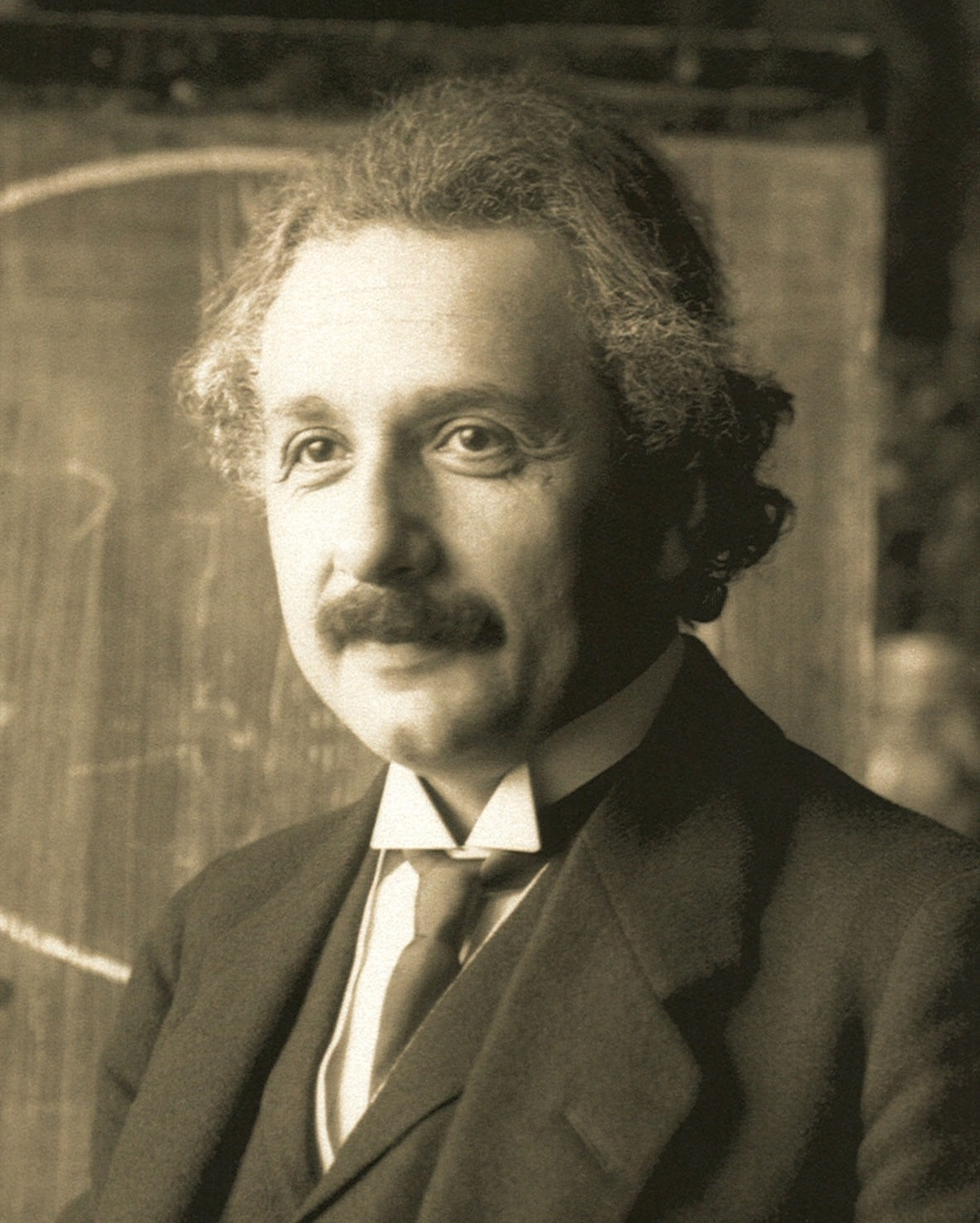
Albert Einstein (1879–1955) discovered the photoelectric effect and theory of relativity.

Modern physics began in the early 20th century with the work of Max Planck in quantum theory and Albert Einstein's theory of relativity. Both of these theories came about due to inaccuracies in classical mechanics in certain situations. Classical mechanics predicted that the speed of light depends on the motion of the observer, which could not be resolved with the constant speed predicted by Maxwell's equations of electromagnetism. This discrepancy was corrected by Einstein's theory of special relativity, which replaced classical mechanics for fast-moving bodies and allowed for a constant speed of light. Black-body radiation provided another problem for classical physics, which was corrected when Planck proposed that the excitation of material oscillators is possible only in discrete steps proportional to their frequency. This, along with the photoelectric effect and a complete theory predicting discrete energy levels of electron orbitals, led to the theory of quantum mechanics improving on classical physics at very small scales.

Quantum mechanics would come to be pioneered by Werner Heisenberg, Erwin Schrödinger and Paul Dirac. From this early work, and work in related fields, the Standard Model of particle physics was derived. Following the discovery of a particle with properties consistent with the Higgs boson at CERN in 2012, all fundamental particles predicted by the Standard Model, and no others, appear to exist; however, physics beyond the Standard Model, with theories such as supersymmetry, is an active area of research. Areas of mathematics in general are important to this field, such as the study of probabilities and groups.

== Core theories ==
Physics deals with a wide variety of systems, although certain theories are used by all physicists. Each of these theories was experimentally tested numerous times and found to be an adequate approximation of nature. These central theories are important tools for research into more specialized topics, and any physicist, regardless of their specialization, is expected to be literate in them. These include classical mechanics, quantum mechanics, thermodynamics and statistical mechanics, electromagnetism, and special relativity.

=== Distinction between classical and modern physics ===
Classical mechanics works for larger and slower objects; modern theories are needed otherwise.

In the first decades of the 20th century physics was revolutionized by the discoveries of quantum mechanics and relativity. The changes were so fundamental that these new concepts became the foundation of "modern physics", with other topics becoming "classical physics". The majority of applications of physics are essentially classical. The laws of classical physics accurately describe systems whose important length scales are greater than the atomic scale and whose motions are much slower than the speed of light. Outside of this domain, observations do not match predictions provided by classical mechanics.

=== Classical theory ===
Classical physics includes the traditional branches and topics that were recognized and well-developed before the beginning of the 20th century—classical mechanics, thermodynamics, and electromagnetism. Classical mechanics is concerned with bodies acted on by forces and bodies in motion and may be divided into statics (study of the forces on a body or bodies not subject to an acceleration), kinematics (study of motion without regard to its causes), and dynamics (study of motion and the forces that affect it); mechanics may also be divided into solid mechanics and fluid mechanics (known together as continuum mechanics), the latter include such branches as hydrostatics, hydrodynamics and pneumatics. Acoustics is the study of how sound is produced, controlled, transmitted and received. Important modern branches of acoustics include ultrasonics, the study of sound waves of very high frequency beyond the range of human hearing; bioacoustics, the physics of animal calls and hearing; and electroacoustics, the manipulation of audible sound waves using electronics.

Optics, the study of light, is concerned not only with visible light but also with infrared and ultraviolet radiation, which exhibit all of the phenomena of visible light except visibility, e.g., reflection, refraction, interference, diffraction, dispersion, and polarization of light. Heat is a form of energy, the internal energy possessed by the particles of which a substance is composed; thermodynamics deals with the relationships between heat and other forms of energy. Electricity and magnetism have been studied as a single branch of physics since the intimate connection between them was discovered in the early 19th century; an electric current gives rise to a magnetic field, and a changing magnetic field induces an electric current. Electrostatics deals with electric charges at rest, electrodynamics with moving charges, and magnetostatics with magnetic poles at rest.

=== Modern theory ===
The discovery of relativity and of quantum mechanics in the first decades of the 20th century transformed the conceptual basis of physics without reducing the practical value of most of the physical theories developed up to that time. Consequently the topics of physics have come to be divided into "classical physics" and "modern physics", with the latter category including effects related to quantum mechanics and relativity. Classical physics is generally concerned with matter and energy on the normal scale of observation, while much of modern physics is concerned with the behavior of matter and energy under extreme conditions or on a very large or very small scale. For example, atomic and nuclear physics study matter on the smallest scale at which chemical elements can be identified. The physics of elementary particles is on an even smaller scale since it is concerned with the most basic units of matter; this branch of physics is also known as high-energy physics because of the extremely high energies necessary to produce many types of particles in particle accelerators. On this scale, ordinary, commonsensical notions of space, time, matter, and energy are no longer valid.

The two chief theories of modern physics present a different picture of the concepts of space, time, and matter from that presented by classical physics. Classical mechanics approximates nature as continuous, while quantum theory is concerned with the discrete nature of many phenomena at the atomic and subatomic level and with the complementary aspects of particles and waves in the description of such phenomena. The theory of relativity is concerned with the description of phenomena that take place in a frame of reference that is in motion with respect to an observer; the special theory of relativity is concerned with motion in the absence of gravitational fields and the general theory of relativity with motion and its connection with gravitation. Both quantum theory and the theory of relativity find applications in many areas of modern physics.

Fundamental concepts in modern physics include:

- Action
- Causality
- Covariance
- Particle
- Physical field
- Physical interaction
- Quantum
- Statistical ensemble
- Symmetry
- Wave

== Research ==
=== Scientific method ===
Physicists use the scientific method to test the validity of a physical theory. By using a methodical approach to compare the implications of a theory with the conclusions drawn from its related experiments and observations, physicists are better able to test the validity of a theory in a logical, unbiased, and repeatable way. To that end, experiments are performed and observations are made in order to determine the validity or invalidity of a theory.

A scientific law is a concise verbal or mathematical statement of a relation that expresses a fundamental principle of some theory, such as Newton's law of universal gravitation.

=== Theory and experiment ===
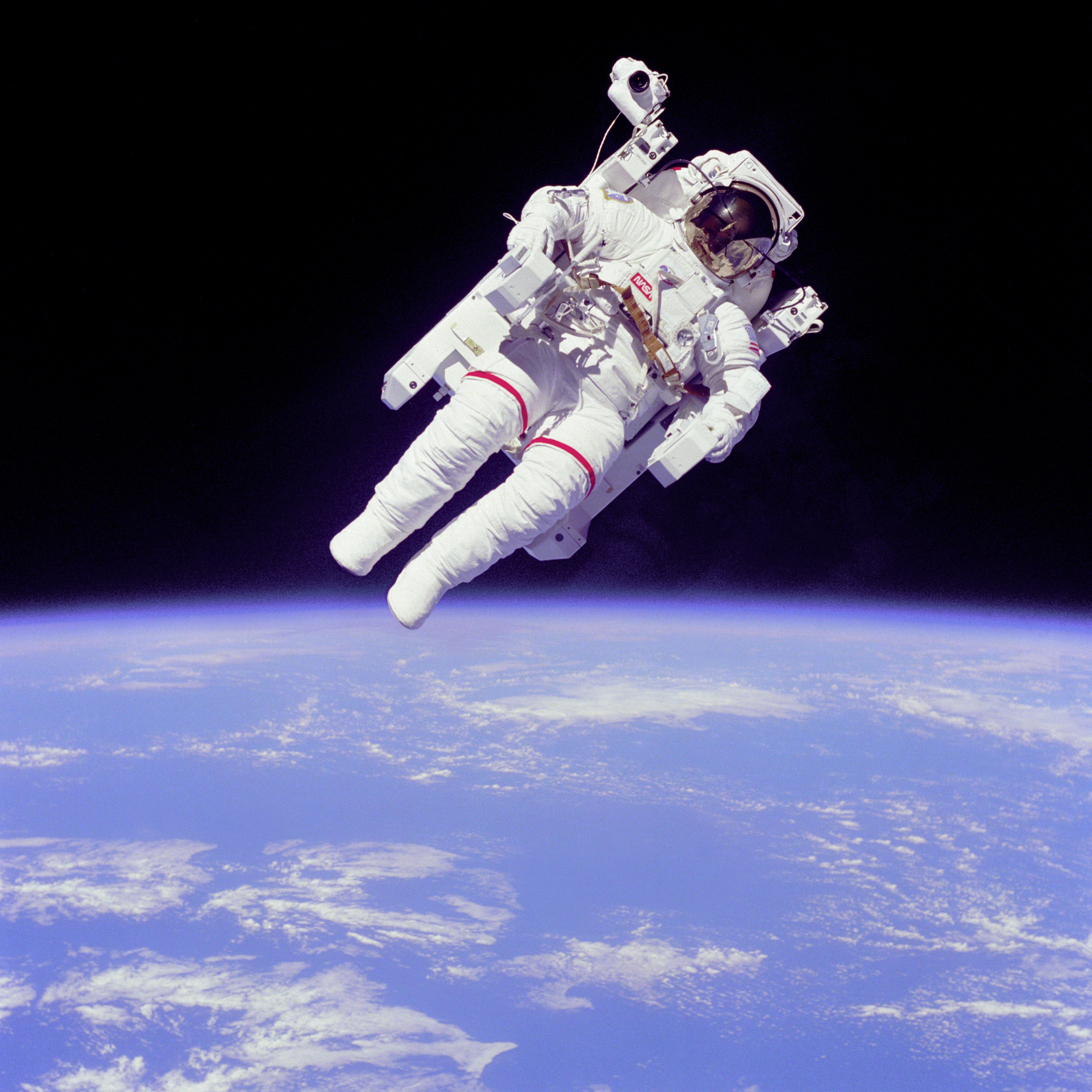
The astronaut and Earth are both in free fall. Pictured: Astronaut Bruce McCandless.

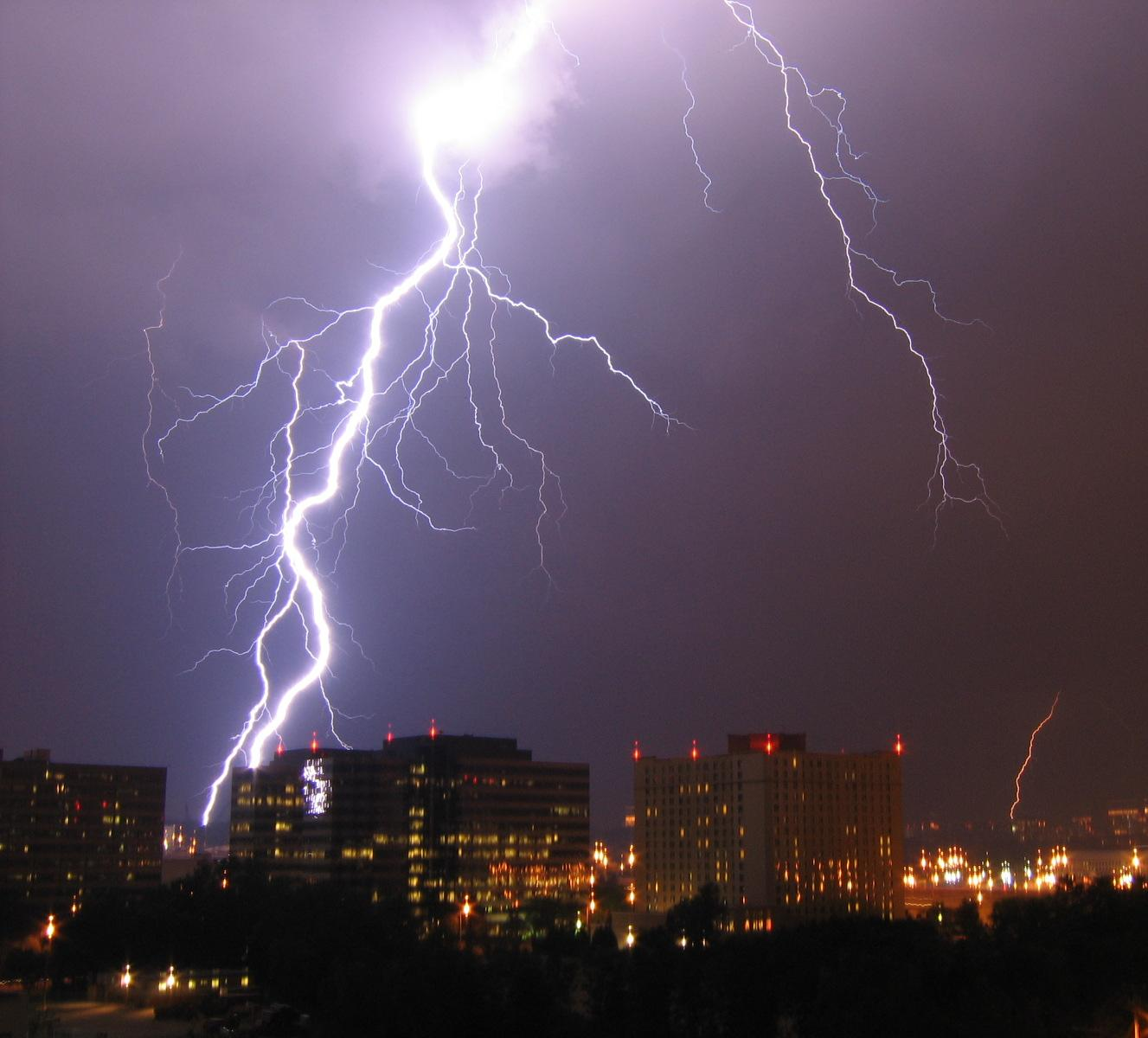
Lightning is an electric current.

Theorists seek to develop mathematical models that both agree with existing experiments and successfully predict future experimental results, while experimentalists devise and perform experiments to test theoretical predictions and explore new phenomena. Although theory and experiment are developed separately, they strongly affect and depend upon each other. Progress in physics frequently comes about when experimental results defy explanation by existing theories, prompting intense focus on applicable modeling, and when new theories generate experimentally testable predictions, which inspire the development of new experiments (and often related equipment).

Physicists who work at the interplay of theory and experiment are called phenomenologists, who study complex phenomena observed in experiment and work to relate them to a fundamental theory.

Theoretical physics has historically taken inspiration from philosophy; electromagnetism was unified this way. (Note: See, for example, the influence of Kant and Ritter on Ørsted.) Beyond the known universe, the field of theoretical physics also deals with hypothetical issues, (Note: Concepts which are denoted hypothetical can change with time. For example, the atom of nineteenth-century physics was denigrated by some, including Ernst Mach's critique of Ludwig Boltzmann's formulation of statistical mechanics. By the end of World War II, the atom was no longer deemed hypothetical.) such as parallel universes, a multiverse, and higher dimensions. Theorists invoke these ideas in hopes of solving particular problems with existing theories; they then explore the consequences of these ideas and work toward making testable predictions.

Experimental physics expands, and is expanded by, engineering and technology. Experimental physicists who are involved in basic research design and perform experiments with equipment such as particle accelerators and lasers, whereas those involved in applied research often work in industry, developing technologies such as magnetic resonance imaging (MRI) and transistors. Feynman has noted that experimentalists may seek areas that have not been explored well by theorists.

=== Scope and aims ===
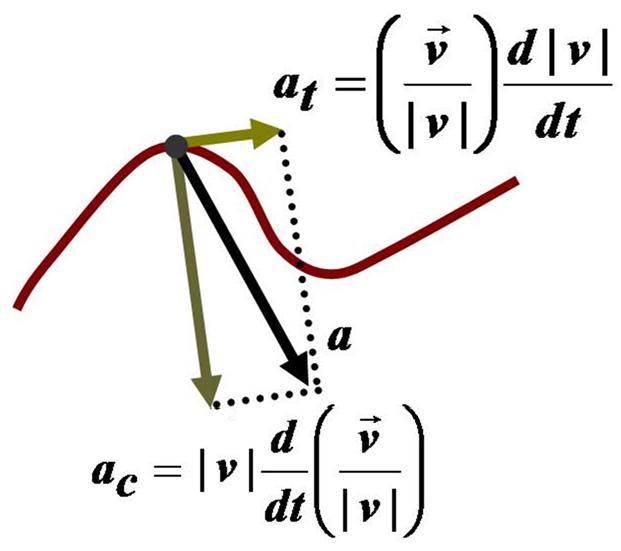
Physics involves modeling the natural world with theory, usually quantitative. Here, the path of a particle is modeled with the mathematics of calculus to explain its behavior: the purview of the branch of physics known as mechanics.

Physics covers a wide range of phenomena, from elementary particles (such as quarks, neutrinos, and electrons) to the largest superclusters of galaxies. Included in these phenomena are the most basic objects composing all other things. Therefore, physics is sometimes called the "fundamental science". Physics aims to describe the various phenomena that occur in nature in terms of simpler phenomena. Thus, physics aims to both connect the things observable to humans to root causes, and then connect these causes together.

For example, the ancient Chinese observed that certain rocks (lodestone and magnetite) were attracted to one another by an invisible force. This effect was later called magnetism, which was first rigorously studied in the 17th century. But even before the Chinese discovered magnetism, the ancient Greeks knew of other objects such as amber, that when rubbed with fur would cause a similar invisible attraction between the two. This was also first studied rigorously in the 17th century and came to be called electricity. Thus, physics had come to understand two observations of nature in terms of some root cause (electricity and magnetism). However, further work in the 19th century revealed that these two forces were just two different aspects of one force—electromagnetism. This process of "unifying" forces continues today, and electromagnetism and the weak nuclear force are now considered to be two aspects of the electroweak interaction. Physics hopes to find an ultimate reason (theory of everything) for why nature is as it is (see section Current research below for more information).

=== Current research ===
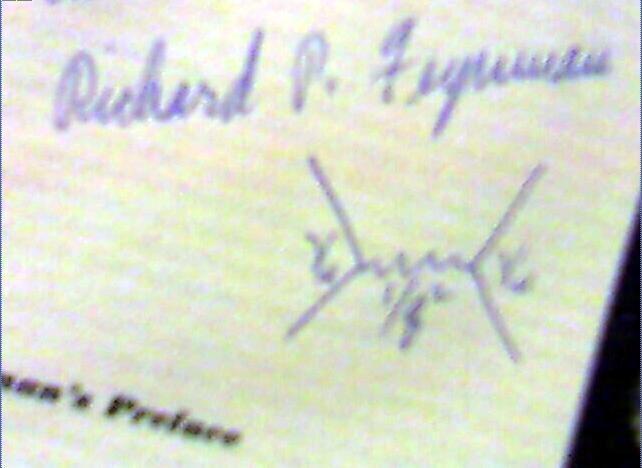
Feynman diagram signed by R. P. Feynman

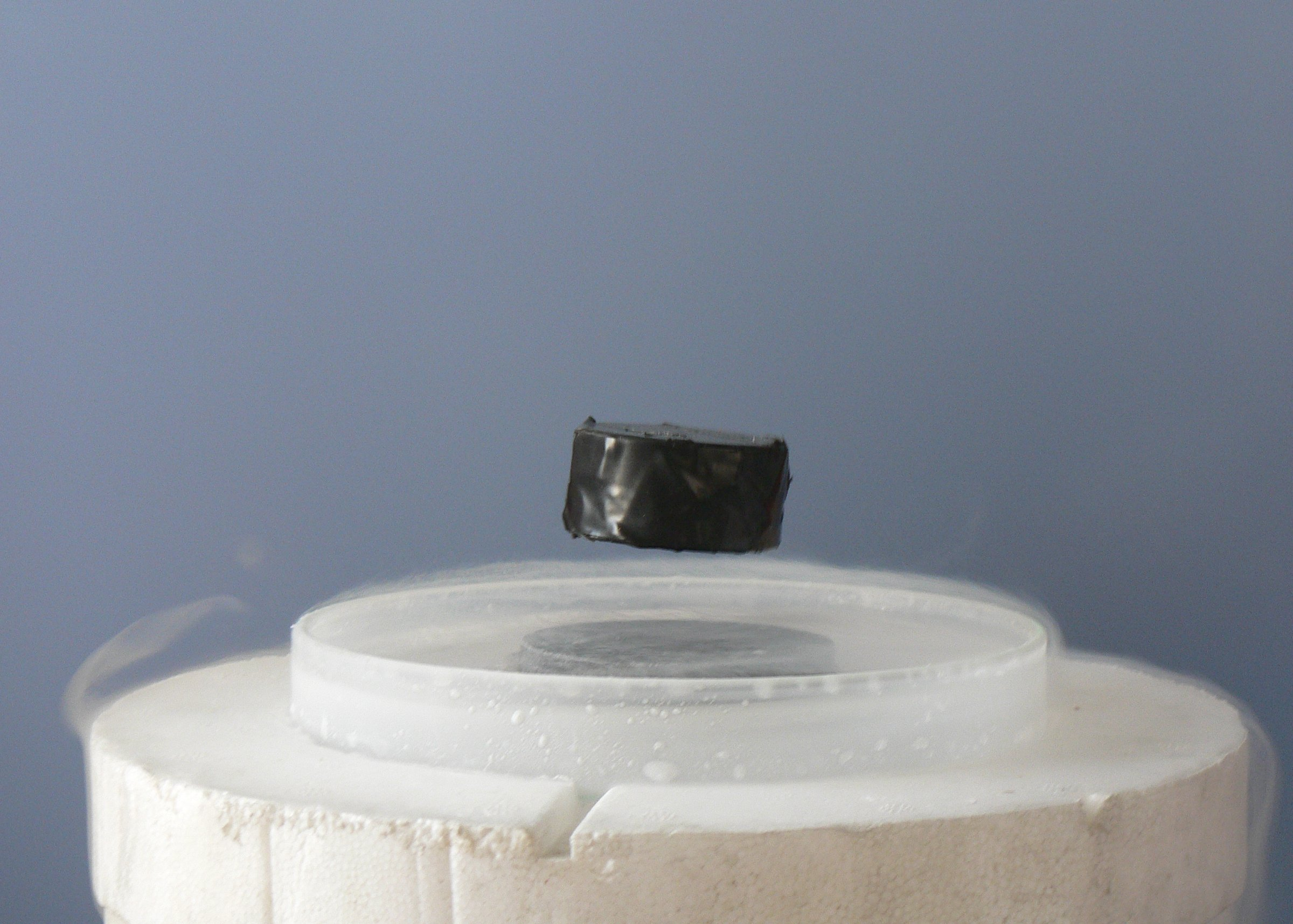
A typical phenomenon described by physics: a magnet levitating above a superconductor demonstrates the Meissner effect.

Research in physics is continually progressing on a large number of fronts.

In condensed matter physics, an important unsolved theoretical problem is that of high-temperature superconductivity. Many condensed matter experiments are aiming to fabricate workable spintronics and quantum computers.

In particle physics, the first pieces of experimental evidence for physics beyond the Standard Model have begun to appear. Foremost among these are indications that neutrinos have non-zero mass. These experimental results appear to have solved the long-standing solar neutrino problem, and the physics of massive neutrinos remains an area of active theoretical and experimental research. The Large Hadron Collider has already found the Higgs boson, but future research aims to prove or disprove the supersymmetry, which extends the Standard Model of particle physics. Research on the nature of the major mysteries of dark matter and dark energy is also currently ongoing.

Although much progress has been made in high-energy, quantum, and astronomical physics, many everyday phenomena involving complexity, chaos, or turbulence are still poorly understood. Complex problems that seem like they could be solved by a clever application of dynamics and mechanics remain unsolved; examples include the formation of sandpiles, nodes in trickling water, the shape of water droplets, mechanisms of surface tension catastrophes, and self-sorting in shaken heterogeneous collections. (Note: See the work of Ilya Prigogine, on 'systems far from equilibrium', and others.)

These complex phenomena have received growing attention since the 1970s for several reasons, including the availability of modern mathematical methods and computers, which enabled complex systems to be modeled in new ways. Complex physics has become part of increasingly interdisciplinary research, as exemplified by the study of turbulence in aerodynamics and the observation of pattern formation in biological systems. In the 1932 Annual Review of Fluid Mechanics, Horace Lamb said:

I am an old man now, and when I die and go to heaven there are two matters on which I hope for enlightenment. One is quantum electrodynamics, and the other is the turbulent motion of fluids. And about the former I am rather optimistic.

== Branches and fields ==
Branches of physics include classical mechanics; thermodynamics and statistical mechanics; electromagnetism; relativity; quantum mechanics, atomic physics, and molecular physics; optics and acoustics; condensed matter physics; high-energy particle physics and nuclear physics; and chaos theory and cosmology; and interdisciplinary fields.

=== Fields ===
The major fields of physics, along with their subfields and the theories and concepts they employ, are shown in the following table.

Field	Subfields	Major theories	Concepts
Nuclear and particle physics	Nuclear physics, Nuclear astrophysics, Particle physics, Astroparticle physics, Particle physics phenomenology	Standard Model, Quantum field theory, Quantum electrodynamics, Quantum chromodynamics, Electroweak theory, Effective field theory, Lattice field theory, Gauge theory, Supersymmetry, Grand Unified Theory, Superstring theory, M-theory, AdS/CFT correspondence	Fundamental interaction (gravitational, electromagnetic, weak, strong), Elementary particle, Spin, Antimatter, Spontaneous symmetry breaking, Neutrino oscillation, Seesaw mechanism, Brane, String, Quantum gravity, Theory of everything, Vacuum energy
Atomic, molecular, and optical physics	Atomic physics, Molecular physics, Atomic and molecular astrophysics, Chemical physics, Optics, Photonics	Quantum optics, Quantum chemistry, Quantum information science	Photon, Atom, Molecule, Diffraction, Electromagnetic radiation, Laser, Polarization (waves), Spectral line, Casimir effect
Condensed matter physics	Solid-state physics, High-pressure physics, Low-temperature physics, Surface physics, Nanoscale and mesoscopic physics, Polymer physics	BCS theory, Bloch's theorem, Density functional theory, Fermi gas, Fermi liquid theory, Many-body theory, Statistical mechanics	Phases (gas, liquid, solid), Bose–Einstein condensate, Electrical conduction, Phonon, Magnetism, Self-organization, Semiconductor, superconductor, superfluidity, Spin
Astrophysics	Astronomy, Astrometry, Cosmology, Gravitation physics, High-energy astrophysics, Planetary astrophysics, Plasma physics, Solar physics, Space physics, Stellar astrophysics	Big Bang, Cosmic inflation, General relativity, Newton's law of universal gravitation, Lambda-CDM model, Magnetohydrodynamics	Black hole, Cosmic background radiation, Cosmic string, Cosmos, Dark energy, Dark matter, Galaxy, Gravity, Gravitational radiation, Gravitational singularity, Planet, Solar System, Star, Supernova, Universe
Applied physics	Accelerator physics, Acoustics, Agrophysics, Atmospheric physics, Biophysics, Chemical physics, Communication physics, Econophysics, Engineering physics, Fluid dynamics, Geophysics, Laser physics, Materials physics, Medical physics, Nanotechnology, Optics, Optoelectronics, Photonics, Photovoltaics, Physical chemistry, Physical oceanography, Physics of computation, Plasma physics, Solid-state devices, Quantum chemistry, Quantum electronics, Quantum information science, Vehicle dynamics		

Since the 20th century, the individual fields of physics have become increasingly specialized, and today most physicists work in a single field for their entire careers. "Universalists" such as Einstein (1879–1955) and Lev Landau (1908–1968), who worked in multiple fields of physics, are now very rare. (Note: Yet, universalism is encouraged in the culture of physics. For example, the World Wide Web, which was innovated at CERN by Tim Berners-Lee, was created in service to the computer infrastructure of CERN, and was/is intended for use by physicists worldwide. The same might be said for arXiv.org)

Contemporary research in physics can be broadly divided into nuclear and particle physics; condensed matter physics; atomic, molecular, and optical physics; astrophysics; and applied physics. Some physics departments also support physics education research and physics outreach.

==== Nuclear and particle ====
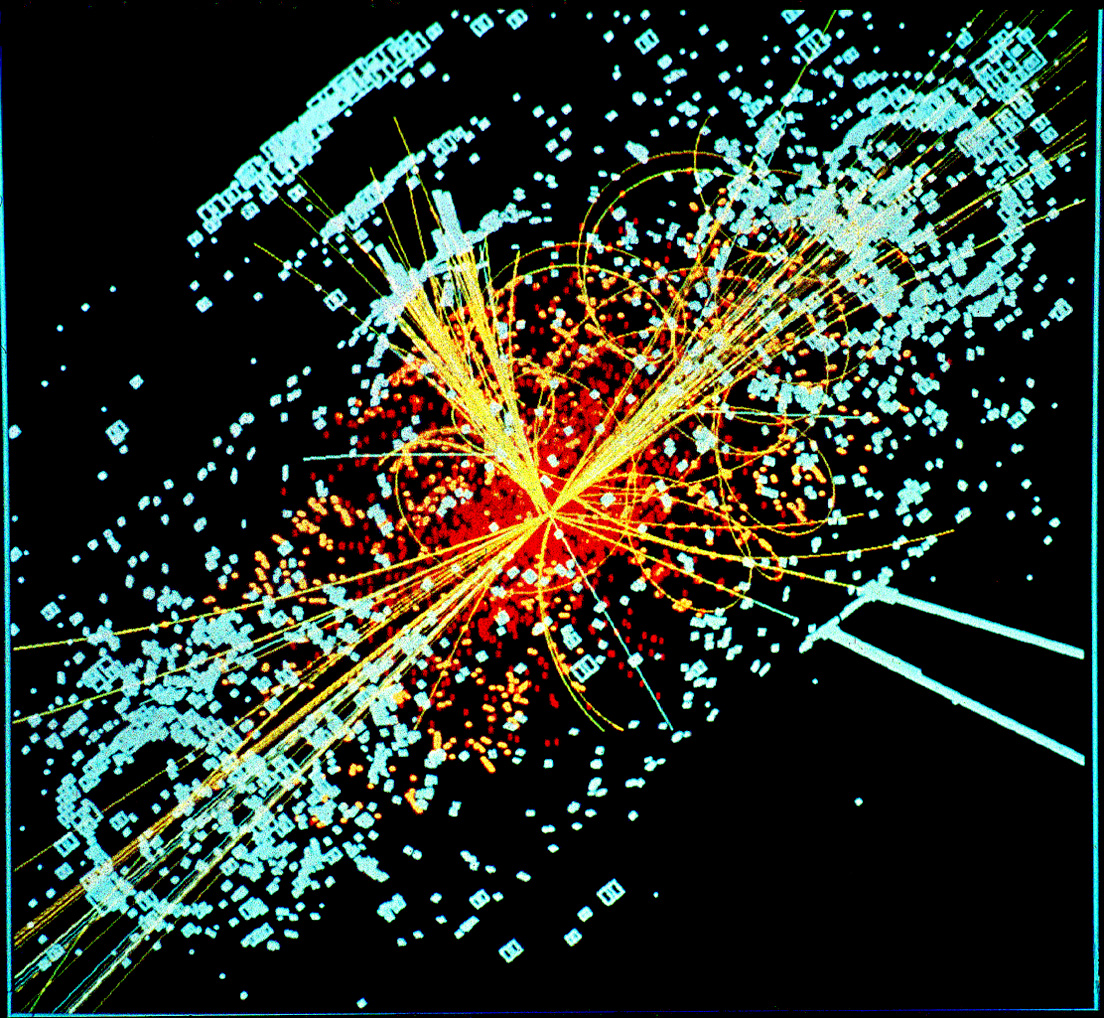
A simulated event in the CMS detector of the Large Hadron Collider, featuring a possible appearance of the Higgs boson

Particle physics is the study of the elementary constituents of matter and energy and the interactions between them. In addition, particle physicists design and develop the high-energy accelerators, detectors, and computer programs necessary for this research. The field is also called "high-energy physics" because many elementary particles do not occur naturally but are created only during high-energy collisions of other particles.

Currently, the interactions of elementary particles and fields are described by the Standard Model. The model accounts for the 12 known particles of matter (quarks and leptons) that interact via the strong, weak, and electromagnetic fundamental forces. Dynamics are described in terms of matter particles exchanging gauge bosons (gluons, W and Z bosons, and photons, respectively). The Standard Model also predicts a particle known as the Higgs boson. In July 2012 CERN, the European laboratory for particle physics, announced the detection of a particle consistent with the Higgs boson, an integral part of the Higgs mechanism.

Nuclear physics is the field of physics that studies the constituents and interactions of atomic nuclei. The most commonly known applications of nuclear physics are nuclear power generation and nuclear weapons technology, but the research has provided application in many fields, including those in nuclear medicine and magnetic resonance imaging, ion implantation in materials engineering, and radiocarbon dating in geology and archaeology.

==== Atomic, molecular, and optical ====
Atomic, molecular, and optical physics (AMO) is the study of matter—matter and light—matter interactions on the scale of single atoms and molecules. The three areas are grouped together because of their interrelationships, the similarity of methods used, and the commonality of their relevant energy scales. All three areas include both classical, semi-classical and quantum treatments; they can treat their subject from a microscopic view (in contrast to a macroscopic view).

Atomic physics studies the electron shells of atoms. Current research focuses on activities in quantum control, cooling and trapping of atoms and ions, low-temperature collision dynamics and the effects of electron correlation on structure and dynamics. Atomic physics is influenced by the nucleus (see hyperfine splitting), but intra-nuclear phenomena such as fission and fusion are considered part of nuclear physics.

Molecular physics focuses on multi-atomic structures and their internal and external interactions with matter and light. Optical physics is distinct from optics in that it tends to focus not on the control of classical light fields by macroscopic objects but on the fundamental properties of optical fields and their interactions with matter in the microscopic realm.

==== Condensed matter ====
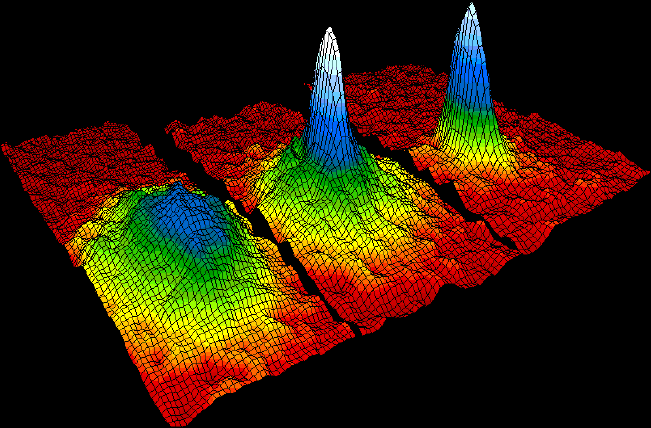
Velocity-distribution data of a gas of rubidium atoms, confirming the discovery of a new phase of matter, the Bose–Einstein condensate

Condensed matter physics is the field of physics that deals with the macroscopic physical properties of matter. In particular, it is concerned with the "condensed" phases that appear whenever the number of particles in a system is extremely large and the interactions between them are strong.

The most familiar examples of condensed phases are solids and liquids, which arise from the bonding by way of the electromagnetic force between atoms. More exotic condensed phases include the superfluid and the Bose–Einstein condensate found in certain atomic systems at very low temperature, the superconducting phase exhibited by conduction electrons in certain materials, and the ferromagnetic and antiferromagnetic phases of spins on atomic lattices.

Condensed matter physics is the largest field of contemporary physics. Historically, condensed matter physics grew out of solid-state physics, which is now considered one of its main subfields. The term condensed matter physics was apparently coined by Philip Anderson when he renamed his research group—previously solid-state theory—in 1967. In 1978, the Division of Solid State Physics of the American Physical Society was renamed as the Division of Condensed Matter Physics. Condensed matter physics has a large overlap with chemistry, materials science, nanotechnology and engineering.

==== Astrophysics ====
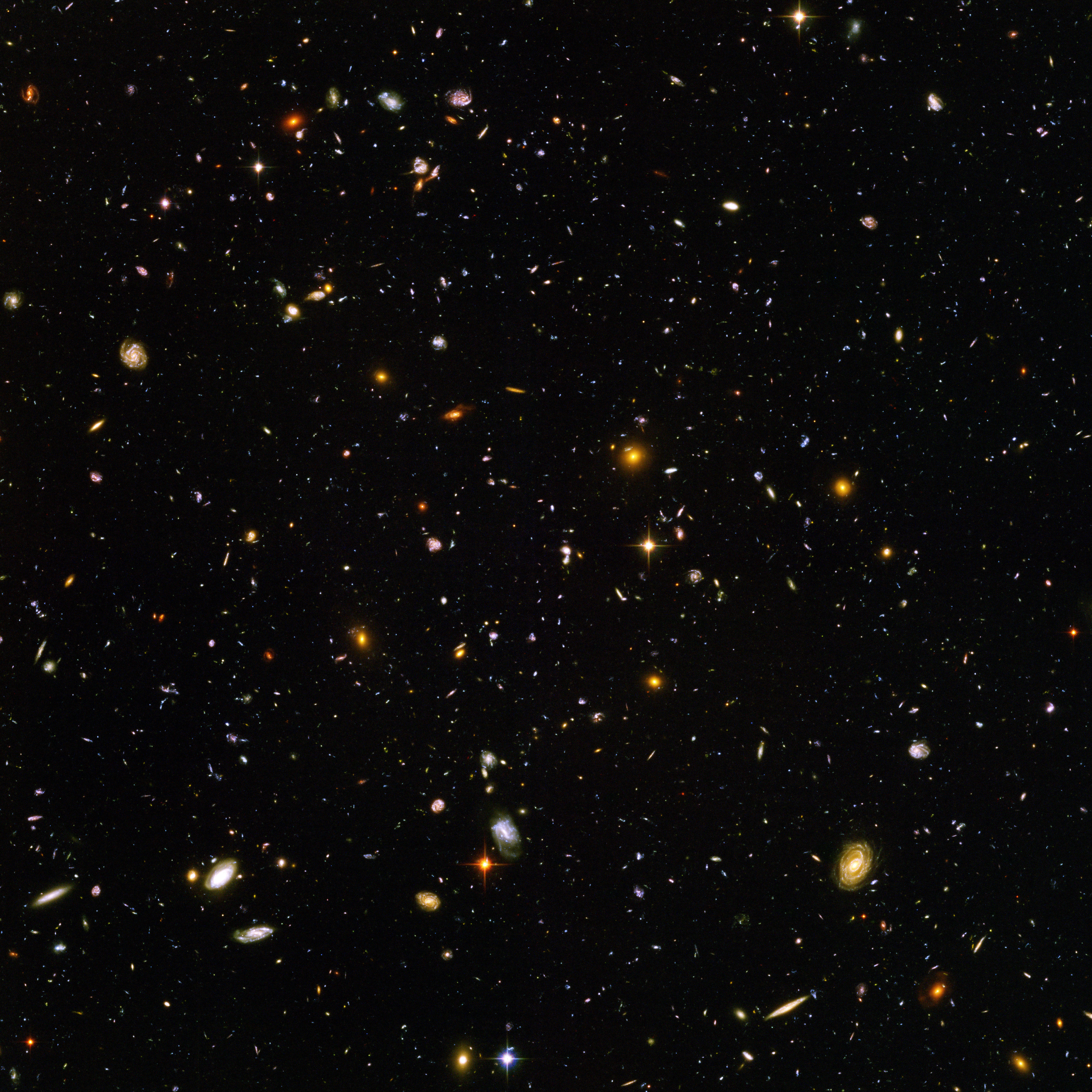
The deepest visible-light image of the universe, the Hubble Ultra-Deep Field. The vast majority of objects seen above are distant galaxies.

Astrophysics and astronomy are the application of the theories and methods of physics to the study of stellar structure, stellar evolution, the origin of the Solar System, and related problems of cosmology. Because astrophysics is a broad subject, astrophysicists typically apply many disciplines of physics, including mechanics, electromagnetism, statistical mechanics, thermodynamics, quantum mechanics, relativity, nuclear and particle physics, and atomic and molecular physics.

The discovery by Karl Jansky in 1931 that radio signals were emitted by celestial bodies initiated the science of radio astronomy. Most recently, the frontiers of astronomy have been expanded by space exploration. Perturbations and interference from the Earth's atmosphere make space-based observations necessary for infrared, ultraviolet, gamma-ray, and X-ray astronomy.

Physical cosmology is the study of the formation and evolution of the universe on its largest scales. Albert Einstein's theory of relativity plays a central role in all modern cosmological theories. In the early 20th century, Hubble's discovery that the universe is expanding, as shown by the Hubble diagram, prompted rival explanations known as the steady state universe and the Big Bang.

The Big Bang was confirmed by the success of Big Bang nucleosynthesis and the discovery of the cosmic microwave background in 1964. The Big Bang model rests on two theoretical pillars: Albert Einstein's general relativity and the cosmological principle. Cosmologists have recently established the ΛCDM model of the evolution of the universe, which includes cosmic inflation, dark energy, and dark matter.

== Other aspects ==
=== Education ===
An Atwood's machine is a machine consisting of a pulley and two masses that is commonly used in physics classrooms to demonstrate Newton's laws of motion.

Physics education or physics teaching refers to the education methods currently used to teach physics. The occupation is called physics educator or physics teacher. Physics education research refers to an area of pedagogical research that seeks to improve those methods. Historically, physics has been taught at the high school and college level primarily by the lecture method together with laboratory exercises aimed at verifying concepts taught in the lectures. These concepts are better understood when lectures are accompanied with demonstration, hand-on experiments, and questions that require students to ponder what will happen in an experiment and why. Students who participate in active learning for example with hands-on experiments learn through self-discovery. By trial and error they learn to change their preconceptions about phenomena in physics and discover the underlying concepts. Physics education is part of the broader area of science education.

=== Careers ===
A physicist is a scientist who specializes in the field of physics, which encompasses the interactions of matter and energy at all length and time scales in the physical universe. Physicists generally are interested in the root or ultimate causes of phenomena, and usually frame their understanding in mathematical terms. They work across a wide range of research fields, spanning all length scales: from sub-atomic and particle physics, through biological physics, to cosmological length scales encompassing the universe as a whole. The field generally includes two types of physicists: experimental physicists who specialize in the observation of natural phenomena and the development and analysis of experiments, and theoretical physicists who specialize in mathematical modeling of physical systems to rationalize, explain and predict natural phenomena.

Physicists can apply their knowledge towards solving practical problems or to developing new technologies (also known as applied physics or engineering physics).

=== Philosophy ===
Physics, as with the rest of science, relies on the philosophy of science and its "scientific method" to advance knowledge of the physical world. The scientific method employs a priori and a posteriori reasoning as well as the use of Bayesian inference to measure the validity of a given theory. Study of the philosophical issues surrounding physics, the philosophy of physics, involves issues such as the nature of space and time, determinism, and metaphysical outlooks such as empiricism, naturalism, and realism.

Many physicists have written about the philosophical implications of their work, for instance Laplace, who championed causal determinism, and Erwin Schrödinger, who wrote on quantum mechanics. The mathematical physicist Roger Penrose has been called a Platonist by Stephen Hawking, a view Penrose discusses in his book, The Road to Reality. Hawking referred to himself as an "unashamed reductionist" and took issue with Penrose's views.

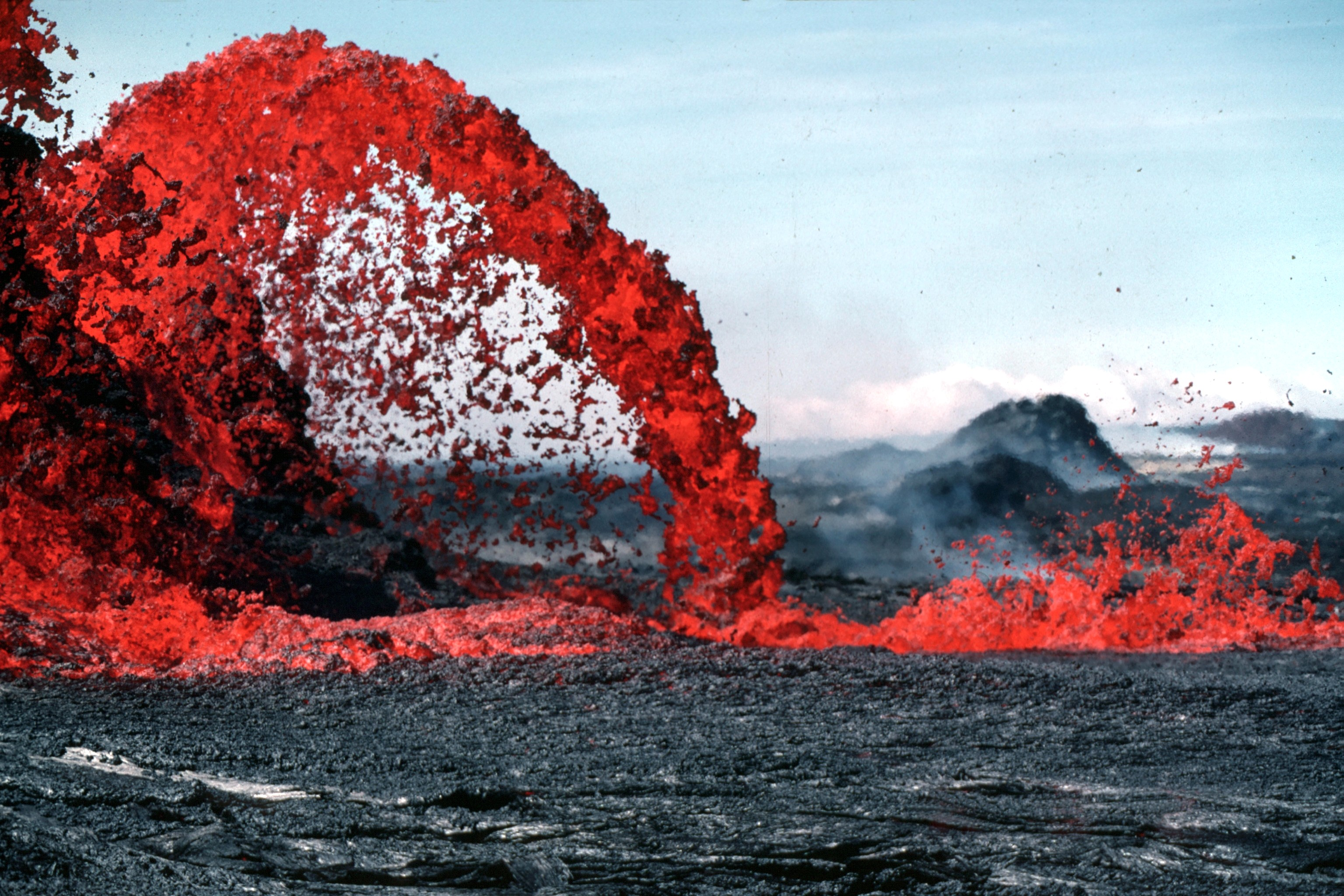
This parabola-shaped lava flow illustrates an application of mathematics in physics—in this case, Galileo's law of falling bodies.

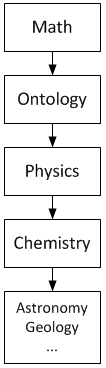
Mathematics and ontology are used in physics. Physics is used in chemistry and cosmology.

Mathematics provides a compact and exact language used to describe the order in nature. This was noted and advocated by Pythagoras, Plato, Galileo, and Newton. Some theorists, like Hilary Putnam and Penelope Maddy, hold that logical truths, and therefore mathematical reasoning, depend on the empirical world. This is usually combined with the claim that the laws of logic express universal regularities found in the structural features of the world, which may explain the peculiar relation between these fields.

Physics uses mathematics to organize and formulate experimental results. From those results, precise or estimated solutions are obtained, or quantitative results, from which new predictions can be made and experimentally confirmed or negated. The results from physics experiments are numerical data, with their units of measure and estimates of the errors in the measurements. Technologies based on mathematics, like computation have made computational physics an active area of research.

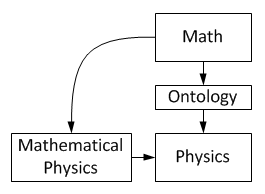
The distinction between mathematics and physics is clear-cut, but not always obvious, especially in mathematical physics.

Ontology is a prerequisite for physics, but not for mathematics. It means physics is ultimately concerned with descriptions of the real world, while mathematics is concerned with abstract patterns, even beyond the real world. Thus physics statements are synthetic, while mathematical statements are analytic. Mathematics contains hypotheses, while physics contains theories. Mathematics statements have to be only logically true, while predictions of physics statements must match observed and experimental data.

The distinction is clear-cut, but not always obvious. For example, mathematical physics is the application of mathematics in physics. Its methods are mathematical, but its subject is physical. The problems in this field start with a "mathematical model of a physical situation" (system) and a "mathematical description of a physical law" that will be applied to that system. Every mathematical statement used for solving has a hard-to-find physical meaning. The final mathematical solution has an easier-to-find meaning, because it is what the solver is looking for.

=== Fundamental vs. applied physics ===
Physics is a branch of fundamental science (also called basic science). Physics is also called "the fundamental science" because all branches of natural science including chemistry, astronomy, geology, and biology are constrained by laws of physics. Similarly, chemistry is often called the central science because of its role in linking the physical sciences. For example, chemistry studies properties, structures, and reactions of matter (chemistry's focus on the molecular and atomic scale distinguishes it from physics). Structures are formed because particles exert electrical forces on each other, properties include physical characteristics of given substances, and reactions are bound by laws of physics, like conservation of energy, mass, and charge. Fundamental physics seeks to better explain and understand phenomena in all spheres, without a specific practical application as a goal, other than the deeper insight into the phenomema themselves.

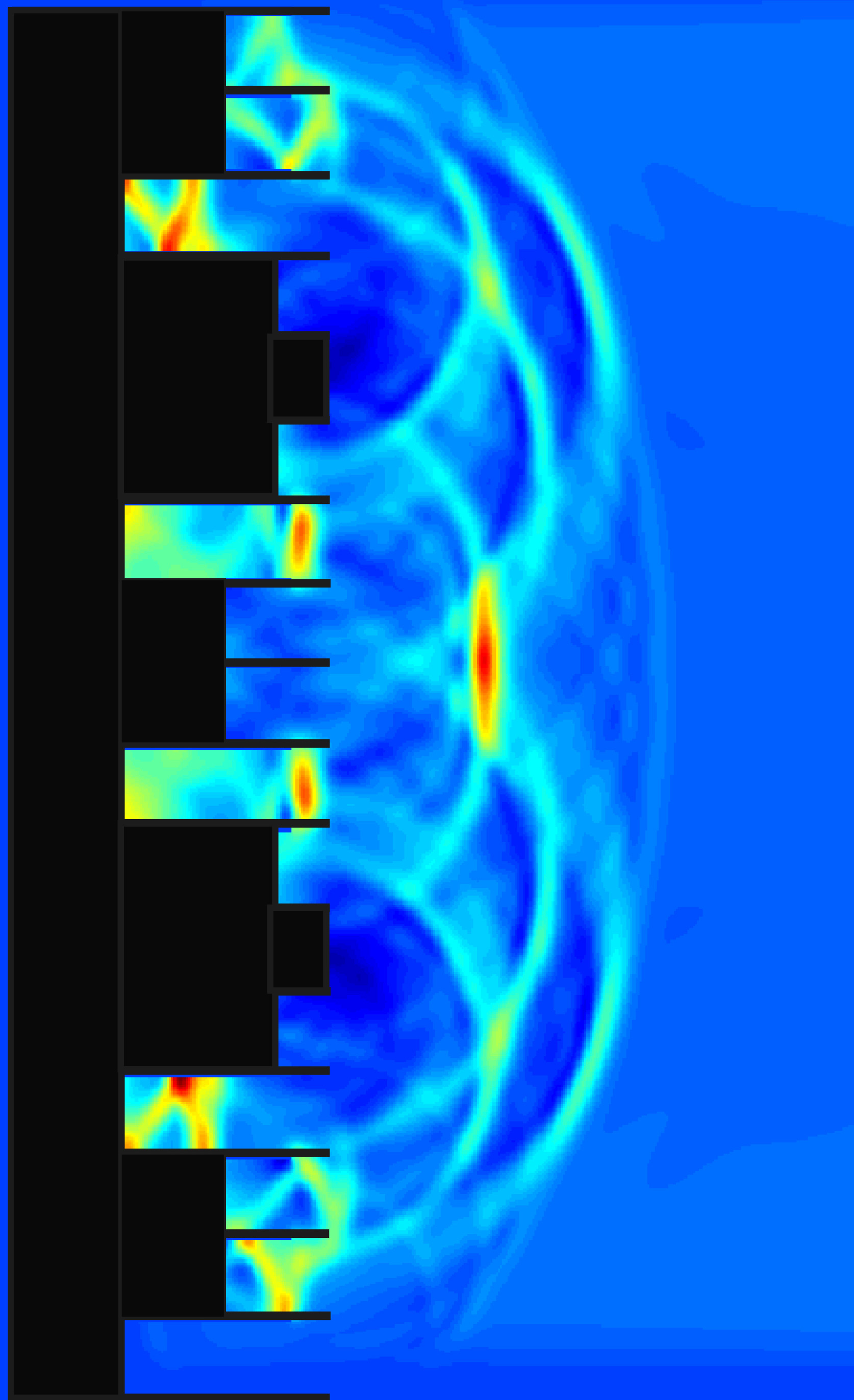
An acoustic engineering model of sound reflecting from an acoustic diffuser, implemented with classical physics

Archimedes' screw, a simple machine for lifting

Applied physics is a general term for physics research and development that is intended for a particular use. An applied physics curriculum usually contains a few classes in an applied discipline, like geology or electrical engineering. It usually differs from engineering in that an applied physicist may not be designing something in particular, but rather is using physics or conducting physics research with the aim of developing new technologies or solving a problem.

The approach is similar to that of applied mathematics. Applied physicists use physics in scientific research. For instance, people working on accelerator physics might seek to build better particle detectors for research in theoretical physics.

Physics is used heavily in engineering. For example, statics, a subfield of mechanics, is used in the building of bridges and other static structures. The understanding and use of acoustics results in sound control and better concert halls; similarly, the use of optics creates better optical devices. An understanding of physics makes for more realistic flight simulators, video games, and movies, and is often critical in forensic investigations.

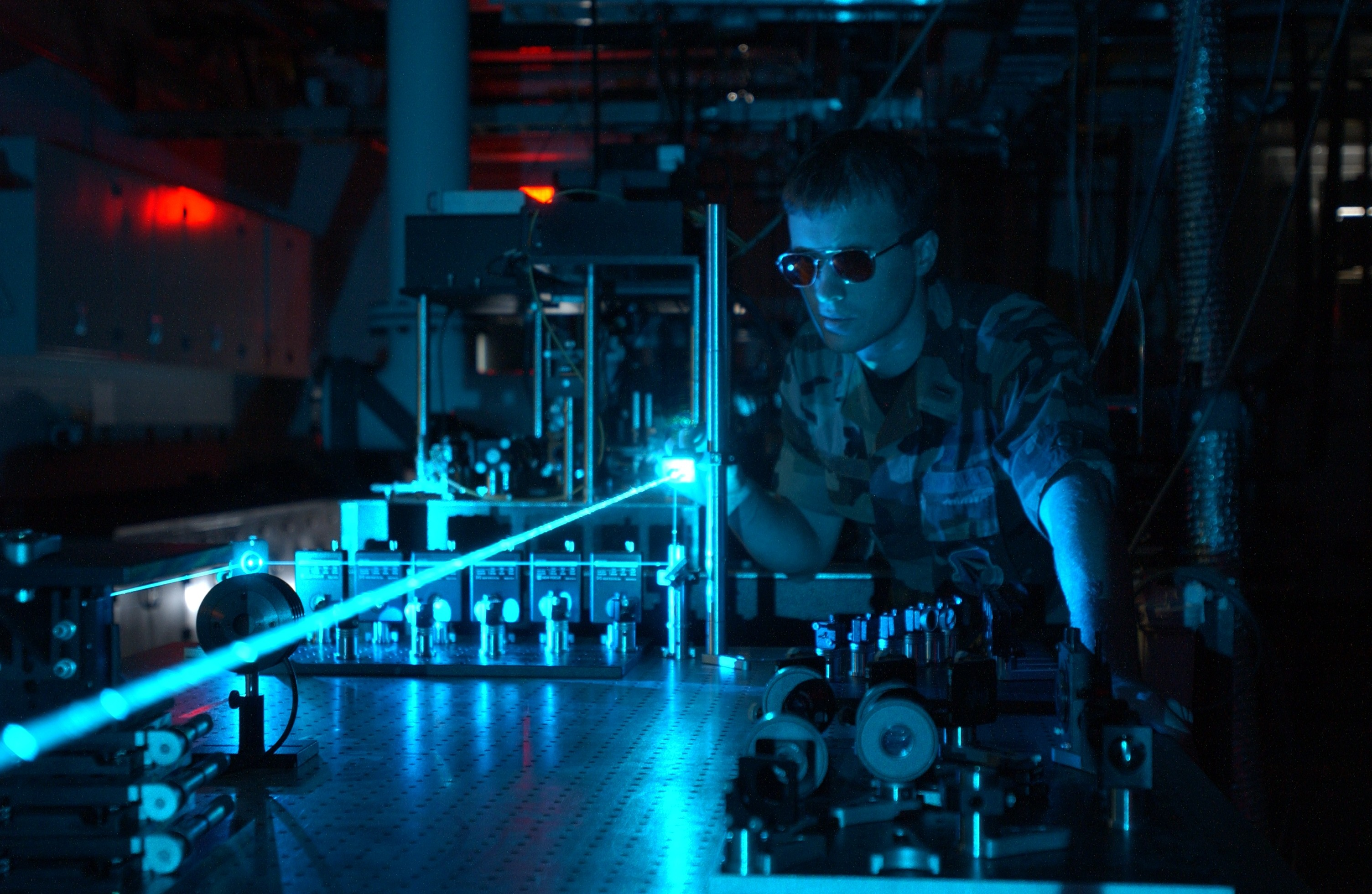
Experiment using a laser

With the standard consensus that the laws of physics are universal and do not change with time, physics can be used to study things that would ordinarily be mired in uncertainty. For example, in the study of the origin of the Earth, a physicist can reasonably model Earth's mass, temperature, and rate of rotation, as a function of time allowing the extrapolation forward or backward in time and so predict future or prior events. It also allows for simulations in engineering that speed up the development of a new technology.

There is also considerable interdisciplinarity, so many other important fields are influenced by physics (e.g., the fields of econophysics and sociophysics).

== See also ==
- Earth science – Fields of natural science related to Earth
- Neurophysics – Study of the nervous system with physics
- Psychophysics – Branch of knowledge relating physical stimuli and psychological perception
- Relationship between mathematics and physics – Relationship between fields of study
- Science tourism – Travel to notable science locations

=== Lists ===
- List of important publications in physics
- List of physicists
- Lists of physics equations

== Sources ==
- Aaboe, A. (1991). "Mesopotamian Mathematics, Astronomy, and Astrology". The Cambridge Ancient History. Vol. III (2nd ed.). Cambridge University Press. ISBN 978-0-521-22717-9.
- Allen, D. (10 April 1997). "Calculus". Texas A&M University. Archived from the original on 23 March 2021.
- Ben-Chaim, M. (2004). Experimental Philosophy and the Birth of Empirical Science: Boyle, Locke and Newton. Aldershot: Ashgate Publishing. ISBN 978-0-7546-4091-2. OCLC 53887772.
- Cho, A. (13 July 2012). "Higgs Boson Makes Its Debut After Decades-Long Search". Science. 337 (6091): 141–143. Bibcode:2012Sci...337..141C. doi:10.1126/science.337.6091.141. PMID 22798574.
- Clagett, M. (1995). Ancient Egyptian Science. Vol. 2. Philadelphia: American Philosophical Society.
- Cohen, M.L. (2008). "Fifty Years of Condensed Matter Physics". Physical Review Letters. 101 (5): 25001–25006. Bibcode:2008PhRvL.101y0001C. doi:10.1103/PhysRevLett.101.250001. PMID 19113681. Archived from the original on 31 January 2013.
- Dijksterhuis, E.J. (1986). The mechanization of the world picture: Pythagoras to Newton. Princeton, New Jersey: Princeton University Press. ISBN 978-0-691-08403-9. Archived from the original on 5 August 2011.
- Feynman, R.P.; Leighton, R.B.; Sands, M. (1963). The Feynman Lectures on Physics. Vol. 1. Addison-Wesley. ISBN 978-0-201-02116-5.
- Feynman, R.P. (1965). The Character of Physical Law. M.I.T. Press. ISBN 978-0-262-56003-0.
- Godfrey-Smith, P. (2003). Theory and Reality: An Introduction to the Philosophy of Science. University of Chicago Press. ISBN 978-0-226-30063-4.
- Goldstein, S. (1969). "Fluid Mechanics in the First Half of this Century". Annual Review of Fluid Mechanics. 1 (1): 1–28. Bibcode:1969AnRFM...1....1G. doi:10.1146/annurev.fl.01.010169.000245.
- Gribbin, J.R.; Gribbin, M.; Gribbin, J. (1998). Q is for Quantum: An Encyclopedia of Particle Physics. Free Press. Bibcode:1999qqep.book.....G. ISBN 978-0-684-85578-3.
- Grupen, Klaus (10 July 1999). "Instrumentation in Elementary Particle Physics: VIII ICFA School". AIP Conference Proceedings. 536: 3–34. arXiv:physics/9906063. Bibcode:2000AIPC..536....3G. doi:10.1063/1.1361756. S2CID 119476972.
- Guicciardini, N. (1999). Reading the Principia: The Debate on Newton's Methods for Natural Philosophy from 1687 to 1736. New York: Cambridge University Press. ISBN 978-0521640664.
- Halpern, P. (2010). Collider: The Search for the World's Smallest Particles. John Wiley & Sons. ISBN 978-0-470-64391-4.
- Hawking, S.; Penrose, R. (1996). The Nature of Space and Time. Princeton University Press. ISBN 978-0-691-05084-3.
- Holzner, S. (2006). Physics for Dummies. John Wiley & Sons. Bibcode:2005pfd..book.....H. ISBN 978-0-470-61841-7. Archived from the original on 28 December 2015. "Physics is the study of your world and the world and universe around you."
- Honderich, T., ed. (1995). The Oxford Companion to Philosophy (1 ed.). Oxford: Oxford University Press. pp. 474–476. ISBN 978-0-19-866132-0.
- Howard, Ian; Rogers, Brian (1995). Binocular Vision and Stereopsis. Oxford University Press. ISBN 978-0-19-508476-4.
- Kellert, S.H. (1993). In the Wake of Chaos: Unpredictable Order in Dynamical Systems. University of Chicago Press. ISBN 978-0-226-42976-2.
- Kerr, R.A. (16 October 2009). "Tying Up the Solar System With a Ribbon of Charged Particles". Science. 326 (5951): 350–351. doi:10.1126/science.326_350a. PMID 19833930.
- Krupp, E.C. (2003). Echoes of the Ancient Skies: The Astronomy of Lost Civilizations. Dover Publications. ISBN 978-0-486-42882-6.
- Laplace, P.S. (1951). A Philosophical Essay on Probabilities. Translated from the 6th French edition by Truscott, F.W. and Emory, F.L. New York: Dover Publications.
- Leggett, A.J. (1999). "Superfluidity". Reviews of Modern Physics. 71 (2): S318–S323. Bibcode:1999RvMPS..71..318L. doi:10.1103/RevModPhys.71.S318.
- Levy, Barbara G. (December 2001). "Cornell, Ketterle, and Wieman Share Nobel Prize for Bose-Einstein Condensates". Physics Today. 54 (12): 14. Bibcode:2001PhT....54l..14L. doi:10.1063/1.1445529.
- Lindberg, David (1992). The Beginnings of Western Science. University of Chicago Press.
- Lloyd, G.E.R. (1970). Early Greek Science: Thales to Aristotle. London; New York: Chatto and Windus; W. W. Norton & Company. ISBN 978-0-393-00583-7.
- Mastin, Luke (2010). "Plato". lukemastin.com. Archived from the original on 3 January 2024.
- Mattis, D.C. (2006). The Theory of Magnetism Made Simple. World Scientific. ISBN 978-981-238-579-6.
- Maxwell, J.C. (1878). Matter and Motion. D. Van Nostrand. ISBN 978-0-486-66895-6. "matter and motion."
- Moore, J.T. (2011). Chemistry For Dummies (2 ed.). John Wiley & Sons. ISBN 978-1-118-00730-3.
- National Research Council; Committee on Technology for Future Naval Forces (1997). Technology for the United States Navy and Marine Corps, 2000–2035 Becoming a 21st-Century Force: Volume 9: Modeling and Simulation. Washington, DC: The National Academies Press. ISBN 978-0-309-05928-2. Archived from the original on 7 April 2014.
- O'Connor, J.J.; Robertson, E.F. (February 1996a). "Special Relativity". MacTutor History of Mathematics archive. University of St Andrews. Archived from the original on 27 October 2019.
- O'Connor, J.J.; Robertson, E.F. (May 1996b). "A History of Quantum Mechanics". MacTutor History of Mathematics archive. University of St Andrews. Archived from the original on 28 October 2019.
- Oerter, R. (2006). The Theory of Almost Everything: The Standard Model, the Unsung Triumph of Modern Physics. Pi Press. ISBN 978-0-13-236678-6.
- Penrose, R.; Shimony, A.; Cartwright, N.; Hawking, S. (1997). The Large, the Small and the Human Mind. Cambridge University Press. ISBN 978-0-521-78572-3.
- Penrose, R. (2004). The Road to Reality. A.A. Knopf. ISBN 978-0-679-45443-4.
- Rosenberg, Alex (2006). Philosophy of Science. Routledge. ISBN 978-0-415-34317-6.
- Schrödinger, E. (1983). My View of the World. Ox Bow Press. ISBN 978-0-918024-30-5.
- Schrödinger, E. (1995). The Interpretation of Quantum Mechanics. Ox Bow Press. ISBN 978-1-881987-09-3.
- Singer, C. (2008). A Short History of Science to the 19th Century. Streeter Press.
- Smith, A. Mark (2001). Alhacen's Theory of Visual Perception: A Critical Edition, with English Translation and Commentary, of the First Three Books of Alhacen's De Aspectibus, the Medieval Latin Version of Ibn al-Haytham's Kitāb al-Manāẓir, 2 vols. Transactions of the American Philosophical Society. Vol. 91. Philadelphia: American Philosophical Society. ISBN 978-0-87169-914-5. OCLC 47168716.
  - Smith, A. Mark (2001a). "Alhacen's Theory of Visual Perception: A Critical Edition, with English Translation and Commentary, of the First Three Books of Alhacen's "De aspectibus", the Medieval Latin Version of Ibn al-Haytham's "Kitāb al-Manāẓir": Volume One". Transactions of the American Philosophical Society. 91 (4): i–clxxxi, 1–337. doi:10.2307/3657358. JSTOR 3657358.
  - Smith, A. Mark (2001b). "Alhacen's Theory of Visual Perception: A Critical Edition, with English Translation and Commentary, of the First Three Books of Alhacen's "De aspectibus", the Medieval Latin Version of Ibn al-Haytham's "Kitāb al-Manāẓir": Volume Two". Transactions of the American Philosophical Society. 91 (5): 339–819. doi:10.2307/3657357. JSTOR 3657357.
- Stajic, Jelena; Coontz, R.; Osborne, I. (8 April 2011). "Happy 100th, Superconductivity!". Science. 332 (6026): 189. Bibcode:2011Sci...332..189S. doi:10.1126/science.332.6026.189. PMID 21474747.
- Taylor, P.L.; Heinonen, O. (2002). A Quantum Approach to Condensed Matter Physics. Cambridge University Press. ISBN 978-0-521-77827-5.
- Thurston, H. (1994). Early Astronomy. Springer.
- Tipler, Paul; Llewellyn, Ralph (2003). Modern Physics. W. H. Freeman. ISBN 978-0-7167-4345-3.
- Toraldo Di Francia, G. (1976). The Investigation of the Physical World. CUP Archive. ISBN 978-0-521-29925-1.
- Walsh, K.M. (1 June 2012). "Plotting the Future for Computing in High-Energy and Nuclear Physics". Brookhaven National Laboratory. Archived from the original on 29 July 2016.
- Young, H.D.; Freedman, R.A. (2014). Sears and Zemansky's University Physics with Modern Physics Technology Update (13th ed.). Pearson Education. ISBN 978-1-292-02063-1.
