= Tommaso and Alessandro Francini =

Florentine hydraulics engineers

Abraham Bosse after Francini, one of the (unbuilt?) fountains of St-Germain-en-Laye, 1624.

Tommaso Francini (1571–1651) and his younger brother Alessandro Francini (or Thomas Francine and Alexandre Francine in France) were Florentine hydraulics engineers and garden designers. They worked for Francesco I de' Medici, Grand Duke of Tuscany, above all at the Villa Medicea di Pratolino, whose water features Francesco de Vieri described thus in 1586: "the statues there turn about, play music, jet streams of water, are so many and such stupendous artworks in hidden places, that one who saw them all together would be in ecstasies over them."

Francesco de' Medici's heir, his brother Ferdinando, was persuaded to part with the Francini brothers in 1597 by his niece Maria, married to Henri IV of France. Their first project, begun in 1598, was to provide fountains, grottoes, waterworks and, above all, water-driven automata for the series of garden terraces at Saint-Germain-en-Laye. The main feature there was a great fountain, from which water was channeled and conducted in siphon tubes to the reservoir in the vaulted area that supported the terrace. From there, through a series of secondary tubes, the water had sufficient head to operate grotto fountains and animate the elaborate automata that were a prized feature of Francini jeux d'eau. The upper grottoes on the third terrace opened from a Doric gallery and featured a dragon, a water organ and Neptune; on the next level, the Grotto of Hercules was flanked by two further grottoes; that on one side was devoted to Perseus and Andromeda, in which the delicately counterbalanced hero was made to descend from the ceiling by the hidden weight of water and slay a dragon that arose from the basin, and on the other a Grotto of Orpheus.

The automata of the elder Francini left a deep impression on René Descartes, and one of the most complete descriptions of Tomasso's original automata is in his 1633 Treatise on Man.

External objects, which by their mere presence act on the organs of sense and thereby cause them to move in many different ways, depending on the arrangement of parts of the brain, are like strangers who on entering the grottoes of [Francini's] fountains unwittingly cause the movements that take place before their eyes. For they cannot enter without stepping on certain tiles which are arranged in such a way that, for example, if they approach a Diana bathing they will cause her to hide in the reeds, and if they move forward to pursue her they will cause a Neptune to advance and threaten them with his trident; or if they go in another direction they will cause a sea monster to emerge and spew water in their faces; or other such things depending on the whim of the engineer who constructed them.

As Descartes believed that human life was essentially mechanical response in the manner of Francini's fountains, Julian Jaynes speculated that Descartes' illegitimate daughter Francine Descartes, born 1635, was named after the Francinis.

The only trace of these features, whose high maintenance requirements cut their careers short when the court moved permanently to Fontainebleau, are in some engravings by Abraham Bosse, apparently derived from Francini drawings. The waterworks and automata at Saint-Germain-en-Laye were the most elaborate such things that had been seen in France up to that time, and Alexandre Francini's engravings of the brothers' works served to mark a distinct stage in the importation and transformation of Italian features in the creation of the French formal garden (Adams 1979:46) and far beyond: cast-iron versions of Francini's two-basin Fontaine rustique, dripping with stony icicles, were familiar features again in Victorian gardens.

Not all of Tommaso Francini's mechanisms for courtly entertainments were garden features. He was the designer of a revolving stage-set for an elaborately produced pageant, Le ballet de la délivrance de Renaud, presented in January 1617 at the Palais du Louvre; several contemporaries remarked on the impressive innovation, which was reinvented in the late nineteenth century, at the Residenztheater, Munich but no one was more impressed than the poet Giovanni Battista Marino, who was present and recreated the illusion in his directions for L'Adone with its elaborately staged intermezzi.

In the reign of Louis XIII, Francini remained in the employ of the Marie de' Medici, the Queen Mother. He worked with Salomon de Brosse, engineering the aqueduct that brought water from the little river of Rungis to the gardens and his Medici Fountain and grotto in the Luxembourg Garden of her Palais de Luxembourg in Paris. Alessandro Francini engraved views of the fountains and brought out a Livre d'architecture in 1631 that featured many fantastically rusticated doorways and gates.

The Francini brothers founded a dynasty of French fountain engineers; a younger Francini worked on fountains in the early stages of Versailles, especially the Grotto of Thetis (completed 1668, described by André Félibien, 1676 and demolished for the enlargement of the château 1686). Members of the Francini clan were still at work in the eighteenth century.

== Selected works ==
- Villa Medicea di Pratolino. Fountains and the water organ.
- Château de Saint-Germain-en-Laye. Grottos and fountains, engraved in 1614 by Alexandre Francini.
- Château de Fontainebleau. As the designer-engineer in charge of the waterworks at Fontainbleau, Tommaso Francini was responsible for fountains and grottoes; among other things, he devised the fountain rebuilt when the "Diana of Versailles" was removed from Fontainebleau to the Louvre, using Prieur's bronze replica cast from it in 1605, which Francini set upon a high Mannerist marble pedestal with bronze hunting dogs and stag's heads by Pierre Briard, 1603, which Francini plumbed to spit water, all set in a parterre.
- Palais du Luxembourg, Paris. Aqueduct, grotto and Medici Fountain.
- Château de Rueil. In gardens laid out by Jean Thiriot to designs of Jacques Lemercier, Francini's Grand Cascade completed about 1638 for the Cardinal de Richelieu, lay at the end of the Grande Allée. It has been suggested that Rueil's cascade and gardens were inspired by those of the Villa Aldobrandini at Frascati. In turn the formal Cascade of Rueil down thirty steps inspired more naturalistic cascades at Versailles, St-Cloud and at Château de Sceaux The cascade at Rueil was replaced by lawn in 1720 and the park was remodelled by the Empress Josephine as part of her Château de Malmaison.
