= Universal causation =

Proposition that everything has a cause

Universal causation is the proposition that everything in the universe has a cause and is thus an effect of that cause. This means that if a given event occurs, it is necessarily the result of a previous, related event. If an object is in a certain state, then it is in that state as a result of another object interacting with it previously.

Western philosophy has been concerned with the idea of universal causation for ages. The authors' formulations however contain profound differences in methodology and philosophical assumptions.

Contemporary philosophers who believe in exception-less, universal, fundamental laws of nature are referred to as "fundamentalists" ; those who reject such a position are referred to as "pluralists". The latter category is minoritary in modern debate.

== Diverse formulations ==
In addition, everything that becomes or changes must do so owing to some cause; for nothing can come to be without a cause.

— Plato, Timaeus, c. 360 BC

Causality is universal. Nowhere in the world can there be any phenomena that do not give rise to certain consequences and have not been caused by other phenomena.

— Alexander Spirkin, Dialectical Materialism, 1984

In contrast, Bertrand Russell argued (in 1912) that the law of causation as usually stated by philosophers is false and is not used in sciences (maybe with exception of their infancy). However his position on universal causation evolved and "was not as naive as it may have appeared". In 1927 Russell writes that the notion of universal causation marks the beginnings of science and philosophy.

== As axioms of causality ==
According to William Whewell (hypothetico-deductivist view) the concept of universal causation depends on three axioms:

1. Nothing takes place without a cause.
2. The magnitude of an effect is proportional to the magnitude of its cause.
3. To every action there is an equal and opposed reaction.

Whewell writes that the first axiom is so clear that it requires no proof if only the idea of cause is understood.

=== Example ===
Example for the axiom: if a baseball is moving through the air, it must be moving this way because of a previous interaction with another object, such as being hit by a baseball bat.

=== Criticism ===
An epistemological axiom is a self-evident truth. Thus the "Axiom of Causality" claims to be a universal rule that is so obvious that it does not need to be proved to be accepted. Even among epistemologists, the existence of such a rule is controversial.

== As Law of Universal Causation or Principle of Universal Causation (PUC) ==
John Stuart Mill describes the Law of Universal Causation in following way:

Every phenomenon has a cause, which it invariably follows; and from this are derived other invariable sequences among the successive stages of the same effect, as well as between the effects resulting from causes which invariably succeed one another.

Contrary to hypothetico-deductivists Mill focuses on inductive reasoning and observations in framing of the Law of Universal Causation i.e. uses basic features of experimental methods and convinces, after critical analysis, that this law is proved by induction better than any other of subordinate generalizations.

The belief we entertain in the universality, throughout nature, of the law of cause and effect, is itself an instance of induction.

Also popular proof and answer to skepticism (for instance that of David Hume) is that PUC has been true in so many cases, that (using basic inductivist scientific method enumerative inductive reasoning) it is reasonable to say that it is true in every case, moreover counter-example i.e. event that does not have a cause is hard to conceive.

== Criticism ==
Modern version of law of universal causation is connected with Newtonian physics, but is also criticized for instance by David Hume who presents skeptical reductionist view on causality. Since then his view on the concept of causality is often predominating (see Causality, After the Middle Ages). Kant answered to Hume in many aspects, defending the a priori of universal causation.

In 2017 book Robert C. Koons & Timothy Pickavance point out four objections to Universal Causation:

1. If we additionally assume mereological universalism, universal causation doesn't exclude self-causation, which is controversial.
2. Pluralized causal principle - there are pluralized versions of universal causation, that allow exceptions to the principle.
3. Robert K. Meyer's causal chain principle, uses set theory axioms, assumes that something must cause itself in set of causes and so universal causation doesn't exclude self-causation.
4. Against infinite regress.

== Spontaneity ==
One implication of Universal Causation is that if a phenomenon appears to occur without any observable external cause, the cause must be internal.

=== Variation ===
Another implication of the Universal Causation is that all change in the universe is a result of the continual application of physical laws.

=== Determinism ===
If all events are cause and effect relationships that follow universal rules, then all events—past, present and future—are theoretically determinate.

=== First Cause and possible exceptions ===
If all effects are the result of previous causes, then the cause of a given effect must itself be the effect of a previous cause, which itself is the effect of a previous cause, and so on, forming an infinite logical chain of events that can have no beginning (see: Cyclic model), however usually it is assumed that there is one (see: Big Bang, the religious belief in Creationism or pseudo-scientific idea of Intelligent design).

Exception for the Universal Causation - First Cause is sometimes pointed out to be logically necessary for it to not contradict itself. An infinite chain of events is hard to conceive in a finite world. The answer is a looped chain of events. But this is also questioned as the whole loop would have no cause. However it can not be ruled out that the Universe is infinite in time or can expand infinitely.

Other exceptions are pointed out - only every of the following things are caused:

- contingent and unnecessary,
- causable,
- that have beginning,
- finite.

== See also ==
- Principle of sufficient reason
- Trademark argument
- Causal adequacy principle
- Causality principle
- Uniformitarianism – Assumption that natural laws are constant through time and space
