= Descartes's theorem (disambiguation) =

In geometry, Descartes's theorem states that, for every four mutually tangent circles, the radii of the circles satisfy a certain quadratic equation.

Descartes's theorem may also refer to:

- Descartes's theorem on total angular defect, on angles in polyhedra
- Descartes's rule of signs, on roots of polynomials

== See also ==
- List of things named after René Descartes
