= Francesco Maria Santinelli =

Italian marquis, count, poet (1627 - 1697)

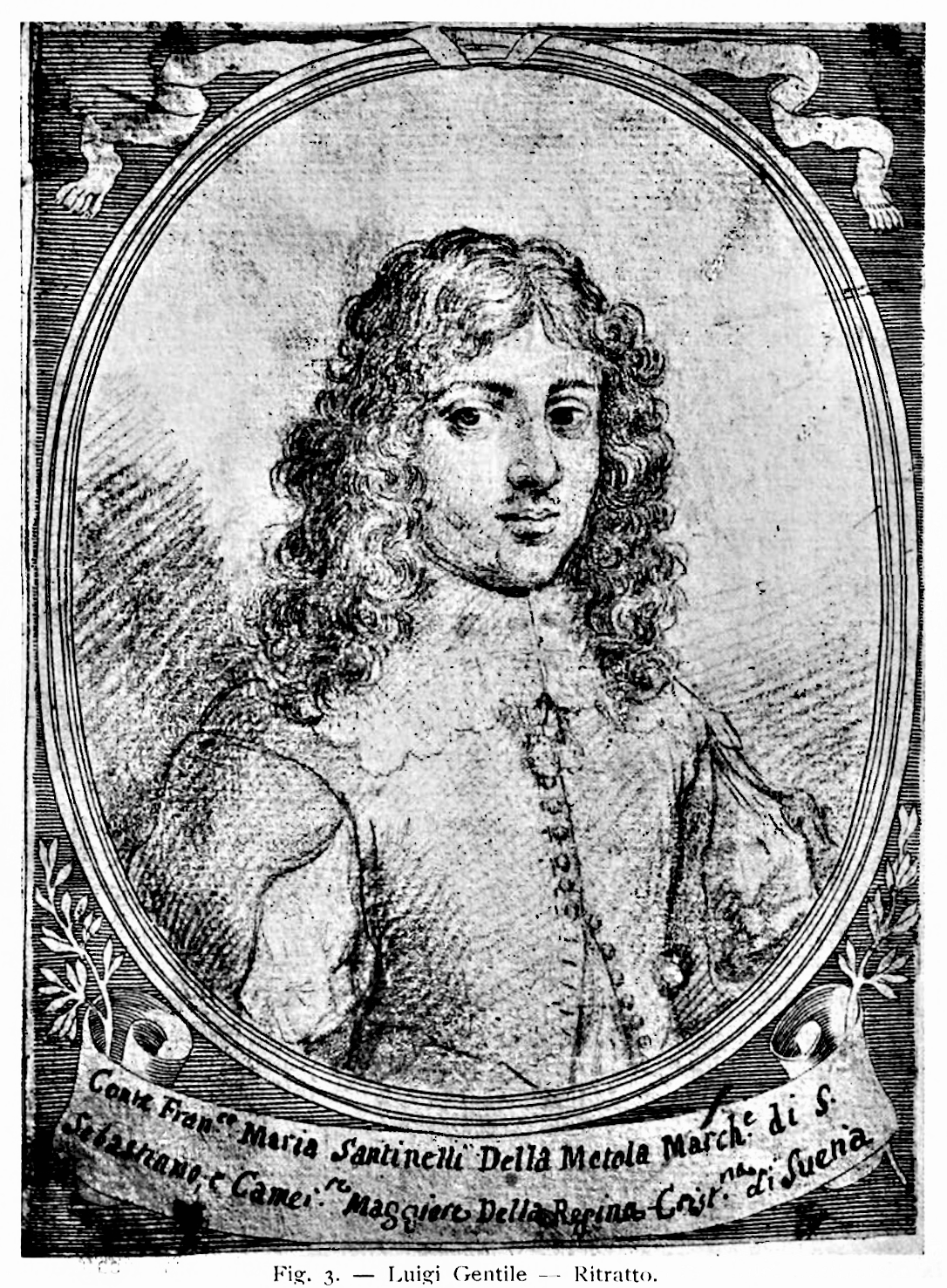
- Francesco Maria Santinelli
- Born: 20 April 1627; Pesaro, Papal States
- Died: 22 November 1697 (aged 70); Rome, Papal States
- Occupations: Poet; Librettist; Alchemist
- Spouse: Anna Maria Aldobrandini (m. 1658)
- Children: 2
- Parent(s): Alessandro Santinelli and Margherita Santinelli (née Santacroce)
- Writing career
- Pen name: Fra’ Marcantonio Crassellame Chinese
- Language: Italian; Latin
- Notable work: Lux obnubilata suapte natura refulgens
- Movements: Baroque; Marinism

Francesco Maria Santinelli (1627-1697) was an Italian marquis, count, Marinist poet, librettist and alchemist. In Senigallia, Christina, Queen of Sweden was welcomed in verse by the handsome Santinelli and his brother, Ludovico, an acrobat and dancer. Both seem to have been accomplished scoundrels. A year later Ludovico was witness and participant at the murder of Gian Rinaldo Monaldeschi at Fontainebleau. (Francesco Maria was on business in Rome during this infamous event.) After the scandal, she promised Pierre Chanut that Ludivico and his two helpers would have to leave her court.

Santinelli was an ardent Hermetic poet, and, as Anna Maria Partini has shown, he is also one of the first known Italian poets to allude to the Rosicrucians in poetic verse.

== Works ==
- Le Donne Gverriere Del Signore Conte Francesco Maria Santinelli. Dedicate All'Eminentissimo Principe Il Signore Cardinale. Rocci, 1647
- Canzoni del conte Francesco Maria Santinelli: Dedicate alla sacra real maestà di Cristina regina gloriosissima di Svetia, 1655
- Prose 1659
- In 1659, Santinelli wrote a poem, Carlo Quinto, ovvero Tunesi racquistata, dedicated to emperor Leopold I of the Holy Roman Empire in Vienna.
- In 1666, Santinelli wrote an alchemical poem with commentary, Lux obnubilata suapte natura refulgens, (Light shining forth by its own nature out of darkness) while using the pseudonym Fra Marc’Antonio Crasselame Chinese.
- L'Armida, nemica, amante, e sposa: Dramma musicale (1669)
- Delle poesie del marchese Francesco Maria Santinelli ...: Prima parte. Consacrata alla sacra cesarea maestà della imperatrice Leonora (1669)
- Delle ode del marchese Santinelli conte della Metola, e marchese di San Sebastiano, &c. cameriero delle chiaue d'oro di sua maestà cesarea: prima parte (1671)
- L'Alessandro overo il trionfo di se stesso: Opera regia (1673)
- Alchimista della Massa Trabaria
- Il catechismo ermetico-massonico della “Stella fiammeggiante”
- Poesie 1680
- Ode 1680
