= Causal adequacy principle =

The causal adequacy principle (CAP), or causal reality principle, is a philosophical claim made by René Descartes that the cause of an object must contain at least as much reality as the object itself, whether formally or eminently.

== Overview ==
Descartes defends CAP by quoting Roman philosopher Lucretius: "Ex nihilo nihil fit", meaning "Nothing comes from nothing".—Lucretius

In his meditations, Descartes uses the CAP to support his trademark argument for the existence of God. Descartes' assertions were disputed by Thomas Hobbes in his "Third Set of Objections" published in 1641.

René Descartes was not the founder of this philosophical claim. It is used in the classical metaphysics of Plato and Aristotle, and features eminently in the works of Thomas Aquinas.

== Details ==
- A "cause" is that which brings something into effect.
- If an item has the quality X formally, it has it in the literal or strict sense.
- If an item has the quality X eminently, it has it in a higher or grander form.

To demonstrate this, a person can possess money formally by holding it on their person, or by storing it in a bank account. Similarly, a person can eminently possess money by owning assets that could readily be exchanged for it.

Descartes offers two explanations of his own:

- Heat cannot be produced in an object which was not previously hot, except by something of at least the same order of perfection as heat.
- A stone, for example, which previously did not exist, cannot begin to exist unless it is produced by something which contains, either formally or eminently everything to be found in the stone.

Descartes goes on to claim that the CAP not only applies to stones, but also the realm of ideas, and the features that are seen as part of the objective reality of an idea.
