= List of things named after René Descartes =

This is the list of things named after René Descartes (1596–1650), a French philosopher, mathematician, and scientist.

== Computer science ==
- Cartesian genetic programming
- Cartesian tree

== Mathematics ==
- Cartesian closed category
- Cartesian geometry
  - Cartesian coordinate system
  - Cartesian equations
  - Cartesian plane
  - Cartesian tensor
- Cartesian monoid
- Cartesian monoidal category
  - Cartesian closed category
- Cartesian oval
- Cartesian product
- Cartesian product of graphs
- Cartesian square
  - Cartesian morphisms
- Descartes number
- Descartes's rule of signs
- Descartes snark
- Descartes's theorem
- Descartes's theorem on total angular defect
- Folium of Descartes

== Physics ==
- Cartesian diver
- Cartesian vortex theory
- Snell–Descartes law

== Philosophy ==
- Cartesian anxiety
- Cartesian circle
- Cartesian doubt
- Cartesian dualism
- Cartesian materialism
- Cartesian theater
- Cartesian Method
- Descartes's demon

== Robotics ==
- Cartesian coordinate robot
- Cartesian parallel manipulators

== Other ==
- Blanche Descartes
- Cartesian linguistics
- Cartesian Meditations
- Cartesian Reflections
- Descartes (crater)
- Descartes-class cruiser
- Descartes' Error: Emotion, Reason, and the Human Brain, a book by António Damásio
- Descartes-Huygens Prize
- Descartes Island (Antarctica)
- Descartes Island (Australia)
- Descartes on Polyhedra
- Descartes Prize
- Lycée René Descartes (Champs-sur-Marne)
