= Pierre Chanut =

French civil servant and diplomat (1601–1662)

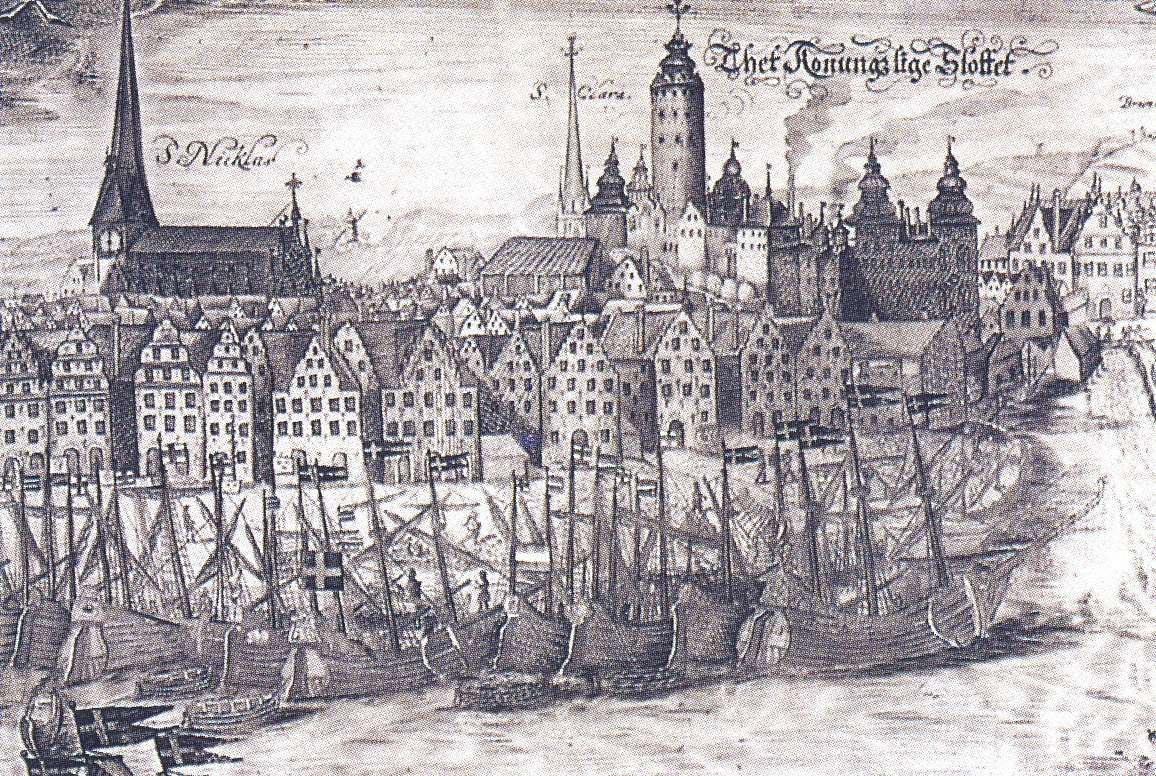
Tre Kronor in 1650 by Wolfgang Hartmann.

Pierre Hector Chanut (February 22, 1601, Riom – July 3, 1662, Livry-sur-Seine) was a civil servant in the Auvergne, a French ambassador in Sweden and the Dutch Republic, and state counsellor.

== Life ==
In 1626 Chanut married Marguerite Clerselier and had eight children. Charged by Jules Mazarin he resided from 1646 to 1649 at the Swedish court and in Osnabrück, where he negotiated the Peace of Westfalia. His companion Antoine de Courtin became Christina's secretary.

In 1646 Chanut met and corresponded with the philosopher René Descartes, asking him for a copy of his Meditations. Upon showing Christina of Sweden some of the letters, the queen became interested in beginning a correspondence with Descartes. She invited him to Sweden, but Descartes was reluctant until she asked him to organize a scientific academy. He resided with Chanut, and finished his Passions of the Soul. Chanut lived at Västerlånggatan, 450 meters from Tre Kronor (castle) on Gamla Stan. There, Chanut and Descartes made observations with a Torricellian barometer, a tube with mercury. Chanut was criticized when he organized a private mass in his house. Descartes died of pneumonia according to Chanut. Over time there have been speculations regarding the death of the philosopher. Theodor Ebert claimed that Descartes did not meet his end by being exposed to the harsh Swedish winter climate, as philosophers have been fond of repeating, but by arsenic poisoning.

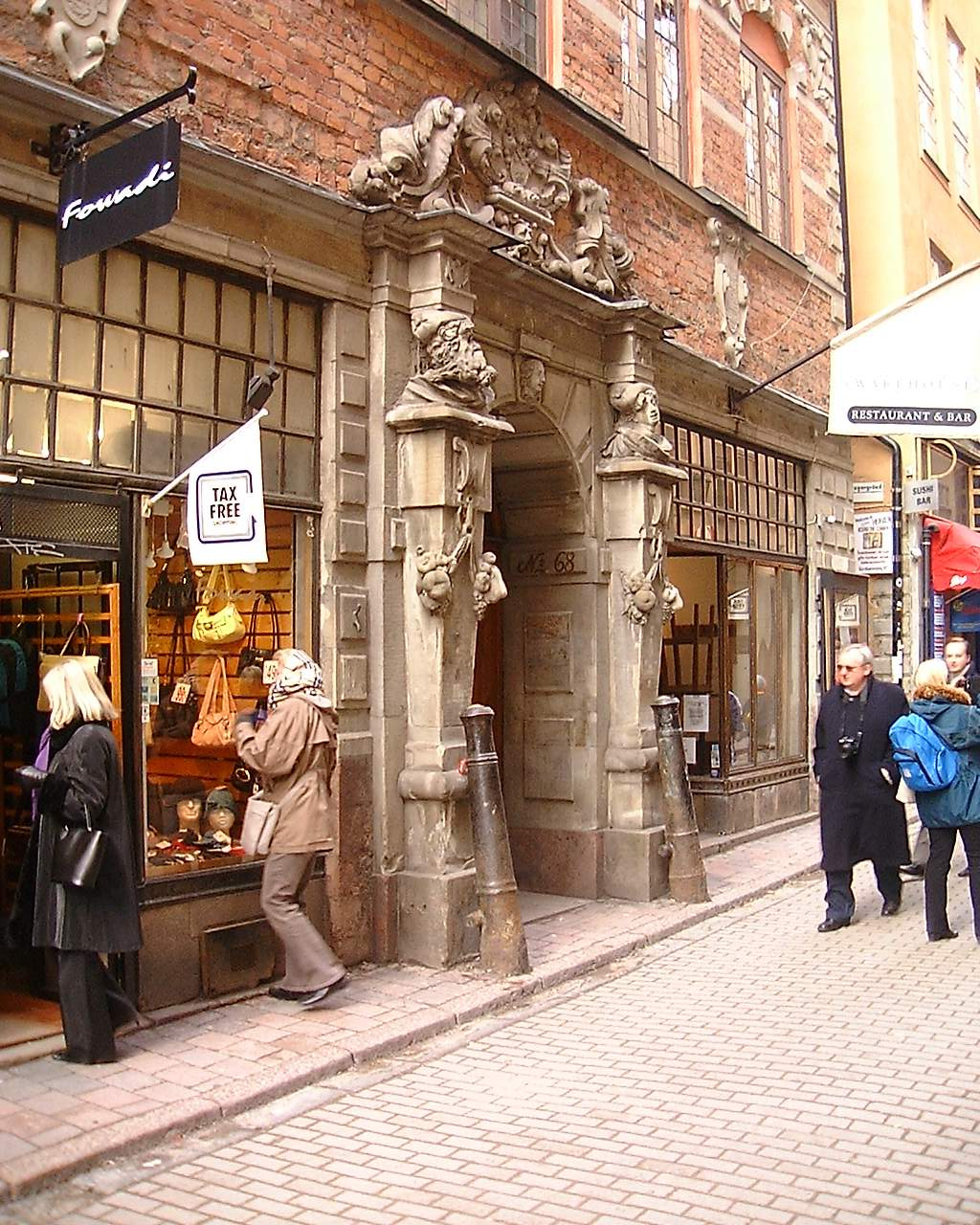
Vasterlanggatan 68

In 1651, during Second Northern War, Chanut departed to Lübeck to a Congress which had to mediate peace between Sweden and Poland. Peace talks failed, however, and in 1653 Chanut returned to Stockholm. He probably invited Pierre Bourdelot and Gabriel Naudé, but departed to The Hague, where he was appointed as ambassador. In 1655, back in Paris, he became Conseiller d'Etat.

In the summer of 1654, Christina left Sweden and settled in Rome. In August 1656 Christina traveled to Paris. In October, apartments were assigned to her at the Palace of Fontainebleau, where she committed an action which stained her memory – the execution of marchese Gian Rinaldo Monaldeschi, her master of the horse. After the murder of Gian Rinaldo Monaldeschi Christina promised Chanut that Ludivico Santinelli and his two helpers would have to leave her court.

His friend and brother-in-law Claude Clerselier, an editor, inherited all the manuscripts by Descartes in 1662 and published them. His Mémoires et Négociations (Memoirs and Negotiations) were published posthumously (1676); his correspondence is preserved in Bibliothèque Nationale in Paris.
