= Francine Descartes =

Rene Descartes's daughter

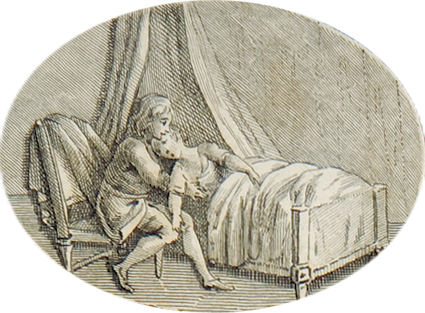
Descartes mourning his daughter

Francine Descartes (19 July 1635, Deventer – 7 September 1640, Amersfoort) was René Descartes's daughter.

== Life ==
Francine was the daughter of Helena Jans van der Strom, a domestic servant of Thomas Sergeant — a bookshop owner and associate of Descartes at whose house in Amsterdam Descartes lodged on 15 October 1634. When Descartes moved back from Amsterdam to Deventer the following winter, Helena went with him. Although Francine was referred to as an illegitimate child, her baptism in Deventer on 7 August 1635, was recorded among the legitimate births. Helena officially remained Descartes's servant, and René referred to Francine as his niece, but both were included in his life. In 1640 Descartes wrote that he would bring his daughter to France to learn the language and be educated, but before that could happen, Francine died of scarlet fever at the age of five. Russell Shorto postulated that the experience of fatherhood and losing a child formed a turning point in Descartes's work, changing its focus from medicine to a quest for universal answers.

Helena was the only woman with whom Descartes is known to have been intimate and she and Descartes appear to have remained close after Francine's death. Helena may have moved with Descartes to his next addresses — including in 1643 to Egmond-Binnen — where in 1644 she married the local innkeeper Jan Jansz van Wel. Notary acts discovered by Jeroen van de Ven show that Descartes provided the 1000-guilder dowry for this wedding. Descartes himself would remain in Egmond-Binnen until 1649, the longest period he ever stayed at any residence.

Francine had four half brothers through her mother, Helena:

- Justinus Jansz van Wel, son of Jan Jansz van Wel, Helena's first husband,
- Jan van Lienen,
- Wouter van Lienen and
- Willem van Lienen from Helena's second husband, Jacob van Lienen.

== As an automaton ==
In 1699, a biographer, Bonaventure d'Argonne, said he was told by a defender of Descartes that Francine never existed, but was in fact a "mechanical automaton" which Descartes created "in order to prove demonstratively that animals do not have souls and that they are nothing but highly complex machines that move when foreign bodies strike them." This story was widely repeated as fact or exaggerated into Descartes creating a Francine automaton in her memory, although it is unclear if d'Argonne actually meant it to be a reliable report or merely a joke about Cartesian philosophy. The story has inspired contemporary artwork.

== In popular culture ==
Francine's family was the subject of a 2016 novel by Guinevere Glasfurd, Words in My Hand.

== Sources ==
- Descartes' Life and Works
- René Descartes (1596–1650)
