= René Descartes =

French philosopher and mathematician (1596–1650)

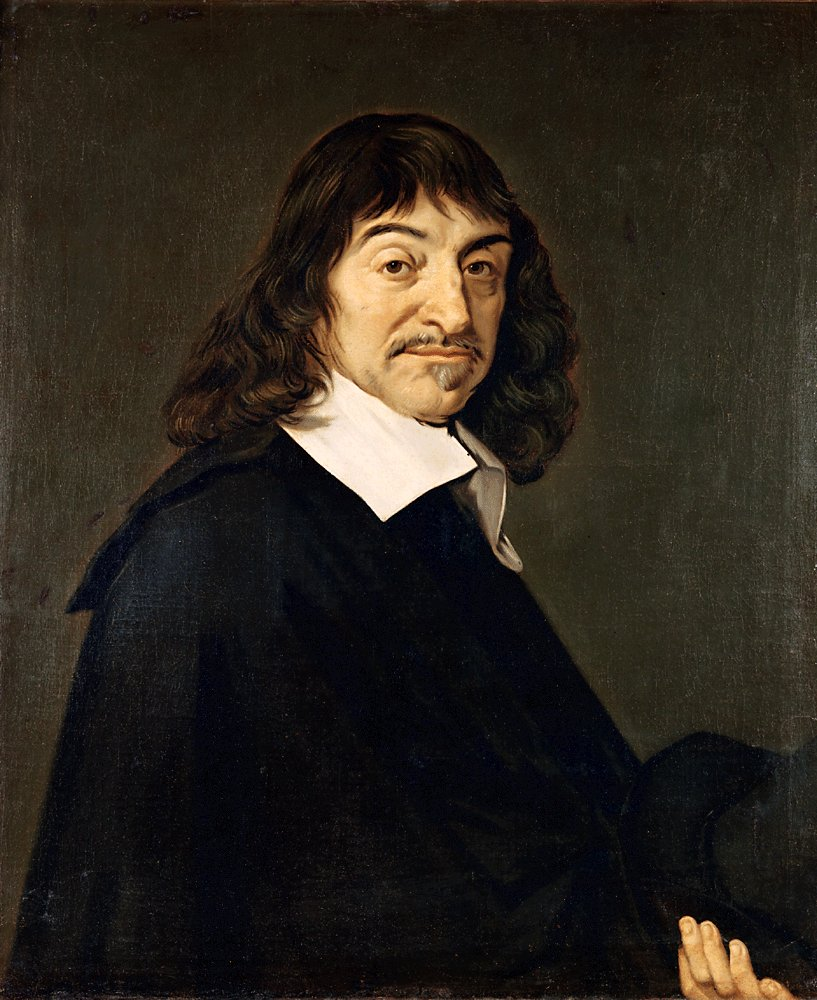
- Portrait after Frans Hals (Note: Although the uncertain authorship of this most iconic portrait of Descartes was traditionally attributed to Frans Hals, there is no record of their meeting. During the 20th century the assumption was widely challenged.)
- Born: 31 March 1596; La Haye-en-Touraine, France
- Died: 11 February 1650 (aged 53); Stockholm, Sweden
- Children: Francine

Education
- Education: Jesuit College of La Flèche (1607–1614); University of Poitiers (LL.B., 1616); University of Franeker (attended); Leiden University (attended)
- Thesis: Theses ex utroque iure de Testamentis ordinandis (1616)
- Academic advisors: Isaac Beeckman; Jacobus Golius; Adriaan Metius; Étienne Noël

Philosophical work
- Era: 17th-century philosophy; Age of Enlightenment
- Region: Western philosophy; Dutch philosophy; French philosophy
- School: Foundationalism; Innatism; Mechanism; Rationalism
- Main interests: Epistemology, metaphysics, mathematics, physics, cosmology, ethics
- Notable ideas: See list: Cogito ergo sum; Method of doubt; Subjectivity; Method of normals; Analytic geometry; Cartesian coordinate system; Imaginary number; Mind–body problem; Cartesian dualism; Interactionism; Trialism; Cartesian circle; Foundationalism; Mathesis universalis; Folium of Descartes; Deus deceptor; Dream argument; Conservation of momentum (quantitas motus); Balloonist theory; Descartes's rule of signs; Wax argument; Trademark argument; Causal adequacy principle; Res cogitans/res extensa distinction; Conatus

René Descartes (/deɪˈkɑːrt/ day-KART, also /ˈdeɪkɑːrt/ DAY-kart; French: [ʁəne dekaʁt]; 31 March 1596 – 11 February 1650) was a French philosopher, mathematician, and scientist whose work was foundational to mathematics and modern philosophy, and influenced the development of early modern science. He connected the previously separate fields of geometry and algebra into analytic geometry, introduced a systematic method of inquiry that became influential in early modern philosophy, and made major contributions to epistemology and philosophy of mind as well as metaphysics.

Refusing to accept the authority of previous philosophers, Descartes frequently set his views apart from the philosophers who preceded him. In the opening section of the Passions of the Soul, an early modern treatise on emotions, Descartes goes so far as to assert that he will write on this topic "as if no one had written on these matters before". His best-known philosophical statement is "cogito, ergo sum" ("I think, therefore I am"; French: "Je pense, donc je suis").

His Meditations on First Philosophy and other philosophical works continue to be studied, and his legacy in mathematics is equally apparent. He is credited as the father of analytic geometry, which facilitated the discovery of infinitesimal calculus and analysis, and the Cartesian coordinate system is named after him.

== Biography ==
=== Early life ===
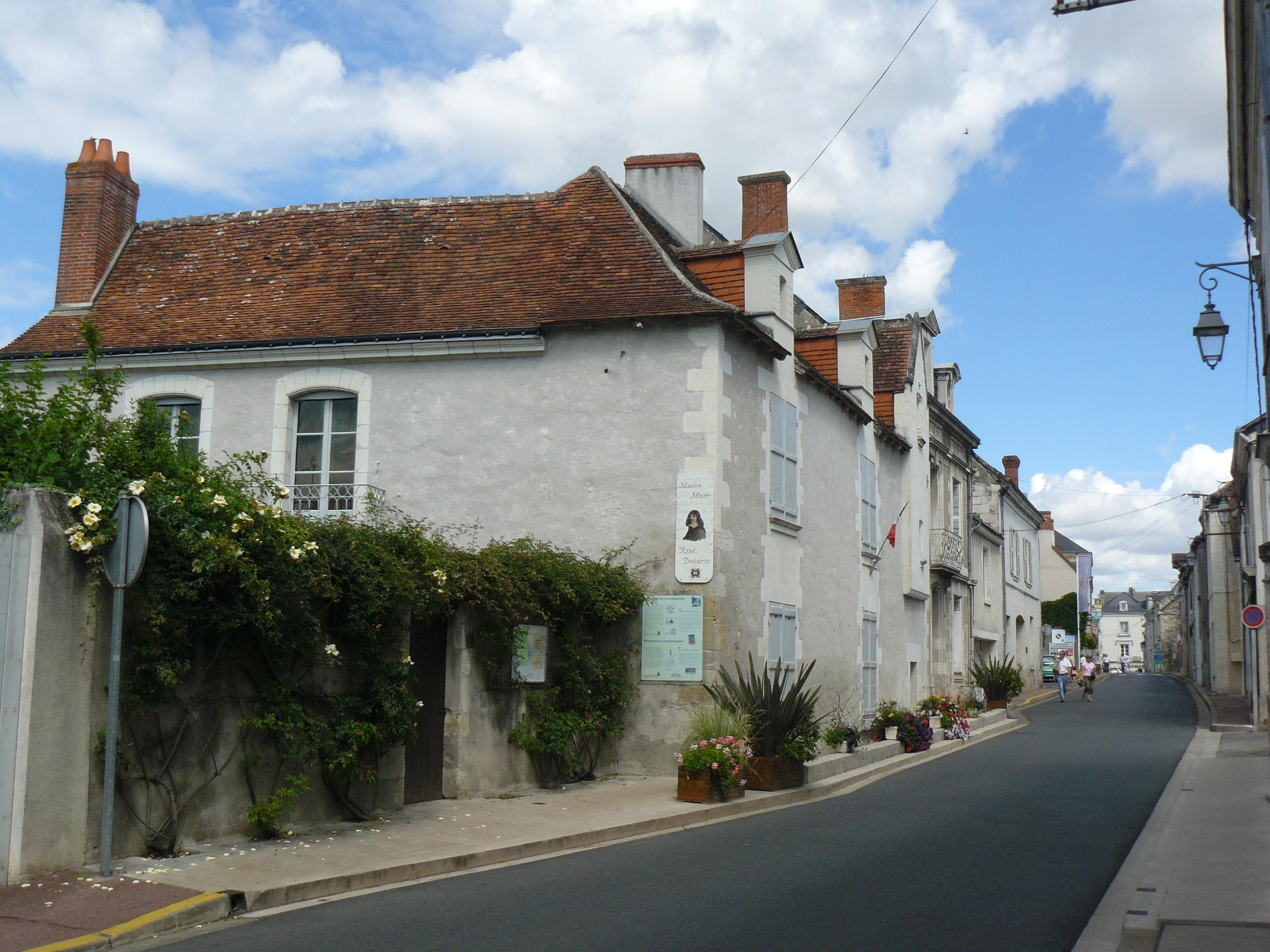
Descartes was born in La Haye en Touraine.

René Descartes was born in La Haye en Touraine, Province of Touraine (now Descartes, Indre-et-Loire), France, on 31 March 1596. In May 1597, his mother, Jeanne Brochard, died a few days after giving birth to a still-born child. Descartes's father, Joachim, was a member of the Parlement of Rennes at Rennes. René lived with his grandmother and with his great-uncle. Although the Descartes family was Roman Catholic, the Poitou region was controlled by the Protestant Huguenots. In 1607, late because of his fragile health, he entered the Jesuit College of La Flèche, where he was introduced to mathematics and physics. After graduation in 1614, he studied for two years (1615–16) at the University of Poitiers, earning a Baccalauréat and Licence in canon and civil law in 1616, in accordance with his father's wishes that he should become a lawyer. (Note: His thesis was titled "Theses ex utroque iure de Testamentis ordinandis" ("Theses from both branches of law concerning the drawing up of wills").) From there, he moved to Paris.

=== Army service ===
In accordance with his ambition to become a professional military officer in 1618, Descartes joined, as a mercenary, the Protestant Dutch States Army in Breda under the command of Maurice of Nassau, and undertook a formal study of military engineering, as established by Simon Stevin. Descartes, therefore, received much encouragement in Breda to advance his knowledge of mathematics. In this way, he became acquainted with Isaac Beeckman, the principal of a Dordrecht school, for whom he wrote the Compendium of Music (written 1618, published 1650).

While in the service of the Catholic Duke Maximilian of Bavaria from 1619, Descartes was present at the Battle of the White Mountain near Prague, in November 1620.

According to Adrien Baillet, on the night of 10–11 November 1619 (St. Martin's Day), while stationed in Neuburg an der Donau, Descartes shut himself in a room with an "oven" (probably a cocklestove) to escape the cold. While within, he had three dreams, and believed that a divine spirit revealed to him a new philosophy. The second dream may have been an episode of exploding head syndrome, in which loud noise is imagined. By the time he exited the room, Descartes had formulated analytic geometry and the idea of applying the mathematical method to philosophy. He concluded from these dreams that the pursuit of science would prove to be, for him, the pursuit of true wisdom and a central part of his life's work.

=== Career ===
==== France ====
In 1620, Descartes left the army. He visited Basilica della Santa Casa in Loreto, then visited various countries before returning to France, and during the next few years, he spent time in Paris. It was there that he composed his first essay on method: Regulae ad Directionem Ingenii (Rules for the Direction of the Mind). He arrived in La Haye in 1623, selling all of his property to invest in bonds, which provided a comfortable income for the rest of his life. Descartes was present at the siege of La Rochelle by Cardinal Richelieu in 1627 as an observer. There, he was interested in the physical properties of the great dike that Richelieu was building and studied mathematically everything he saw during the siege. He also met French mathematician Girard Desargues. In the autumn of that year, in the residence of the papal nuncio Guidi di Bagno, where he came with Mersenne and many other scholars to listen to a lecture given by the alchemist, Nicolas de Villiers, sieur de Chandoux, on the principles of a supposed new philosophy, Cardinal Bérulle urged him to write an exposition of his new philosophy in some location beyond the reach of the Inquisition.

==== Netherlands ====
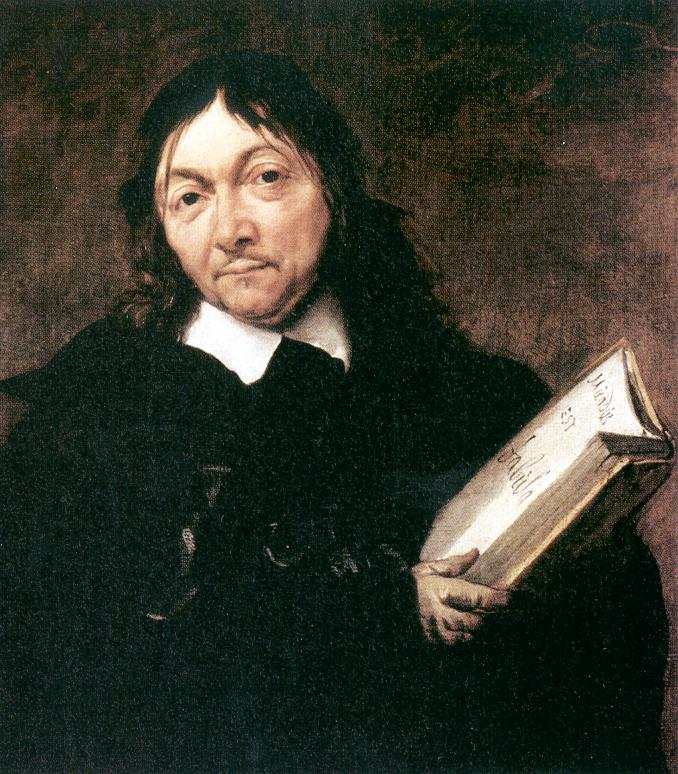
Portrait of René Descartes by Jan Baptist Weenix, 1647–1649

Descartes returned to the Dutch Republic in 1628. In April 1629, he joined the University of Franeker, studying under Adriaan Metius, either living with a Catholic family or renting the Sjaerdemaslot. The next year, under the name "Poitevin", he enrolled at Leiden University, which at the time was a Protestant University. He studied both mathematics with Jacobus Golius, who confronted him with Pappus's hexagon theorem, and astronomy with Martin Hortensius. In October 1630, he had a falling-out with Beeckman, whom he accused of plagiarizing some of his ideas. In Amsterdam, he had a relationship with a servant girl, Helena Jans van der Strom, with whom he had a daughter, Francine, who was born in 1635 in Deventer. She was baptized a Protestant and died of scarlet fever at the age of 5.

Unlike many moralists of the time, Descartes did not deprecate the passions but instead defended them; he wept upon Francine's death in 1640. According to a 2018 biography by Jason Porterfield, "Descartes said that he did not believe that one must refrain from tears to prove oneself a man." Russell Shorto speculates that the experience of fatherhood and losing a child formed a turning point in Descartes's work, changing its focus from medicine to a quest for universal answers.

Despite frequent moves, (Note: While in the Netherlands he changed his address frequently, living among other places in Dordrecht (1628), Franeker (1629), Amsterdam (1629–1630), Leiden (1630), Amsterdam (1630–1632), Deventer (1632–1634), Amsterdam (1634–1635), Utrecht (1635–1636), Leiden (1636), Egmond (1636–1638), Santpoort (1638–1640), Leiden (1640–1641), Endegeest (a castle near Oegstgeest) (1641–1643), and finally for an extended time in Egmond-Binnen (1643–1649).) he wrote all of his major work during his 20-plus years in the Netherlands, initiating a revolution in mathematics and philosophy. (Note: He had lived with Henricus Reneri in Deventer and Amsterdam, and had met with Constantijn Huygens and Vopiscus Fortunatus Plempius; Descartes was interviewed by Frans Burman at Egmond-Binnen in 1648. Henricus Regius, Jan Stampioen, Frans van Schooten, Comenius and Gisbertus Voetius were his main opponents.) In 1633, Galileo was condemned by the Italian Inquisition, and Descartes abandoned plans to publish Treatise on the World, his work of the previous four years. Nevertheless, in 1637, he published parts of this work in three essays: Les Météores (The Meteors), La Dioptrique (Dioptrics), and La Géométrie (Geometry), preceded by an introduction, his famous Discours de la méthode (Discourse on the Method). In it, Descartes lays out four rules of thought, meant to ensure that our knowledge rests upon a firm foundation:

The first was never to accept anything for true which I did not know to be such; that is to say, carefully to avoid precipitancy and prejudice, and to comprise nothing more in my judgment than what was presented to my mind so clearly and distinctly as to exclude all ground of doubt.

In La Géométrie, Descartes exploited the discoveries he made with Pierre de Fermat. This later became known as Cartesian geometry.

Descartes continued to publish works concerning both mathematics and philosophy for the rest of his life. In 1641, he published a metaphysics treatise, Meditationes de Prima Philosophia (Meditations on First Philosophy), written in Latin and thus addressed to the learned. It was followed in 1644 by Principia Philosophiae (Principles of Philosophy), which was dedicated to Princess Elisabeth of Bohemia, a kind of synthesis of the Discourse on the Method and Meditations on First Philosophy.

In 1643, Cartesian philosophy was condemned at the University of Utrecht, and Descartes was obliged to flee to the Hague, then eventually to the north of Amsterdam, ultimately settling in Egmond-Binnen.

Between 1643 and 1649 Descartes lived with his girlfriend at Egmond-Binnen in an inn. Descartes became friendly with Anthony Studler van Zurck, lord of Bergen, and participated in the design of his mansion and estate. He also met Dirck Rembrantsz van Nierop, a mathematician and surveyor. He was so impressed by Van Nierop's knowledge that he even brought him to the attention of Constantijn Huygens and Frans van Schooten.

Descartes began (through Alfonso Polloti, an Italian general in Dutch service) a six-year correspondence with Princess Elisabeth of Bohemia, devoted mainly to moral and psychological subjects. Connected with this correspondence, in 1649 he published Les Passions de l'âme (The Passions of the Soul), which he dedicated to the Princess. A French translation of Principia Philosophiae, prepared by Abbot Claude Picot, was published in 1647. This edition was also dedicated to Princess Elisabeth. In the preface to the French edition, Descartes praised true philosophy as a means to attain wisdom. He identifies four ordinary sources to reach wisdom and finally says that there is a fifth, better and more secure, consisting in the search for first causes.

==== Sweden ====
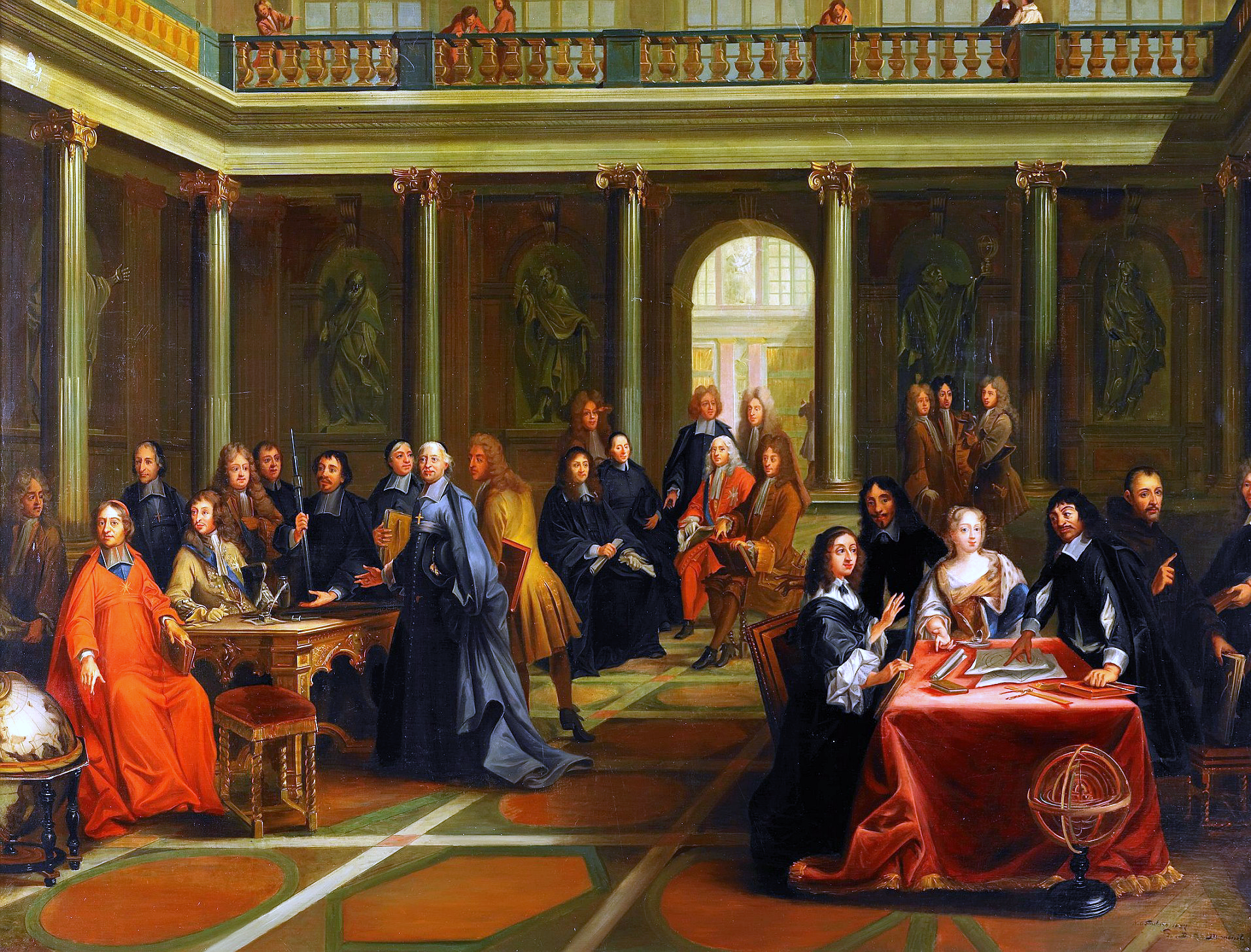
Descartes in conversation with Queen Christina in Stockholm

By 1649, Descartes had become one of Europe's most famous philosophers and scientists. That year, Christina, Queen of Sweden invited him to her court to organize a new scientific academy and tutor her in his ideas about love. Descartes accepted, and moved to the Swedish Empire in the middle of winter. Christina was interested in and stimulated Descartes to publish The Passions of the Soul.

He was a guest at the house of Pierre Chanut, living on Västerlånggatan, less than 500 meters from Castle Tre Kronor in Stockholm. There, Chanut and Descartes made observations with a Torricellian mercury barometer. Challenging Blaise Pascal, Descartes took the first set of barometric readings in Stockholm to see if atmospheric pressure could be used in forecasting the weather.

=== Death ===
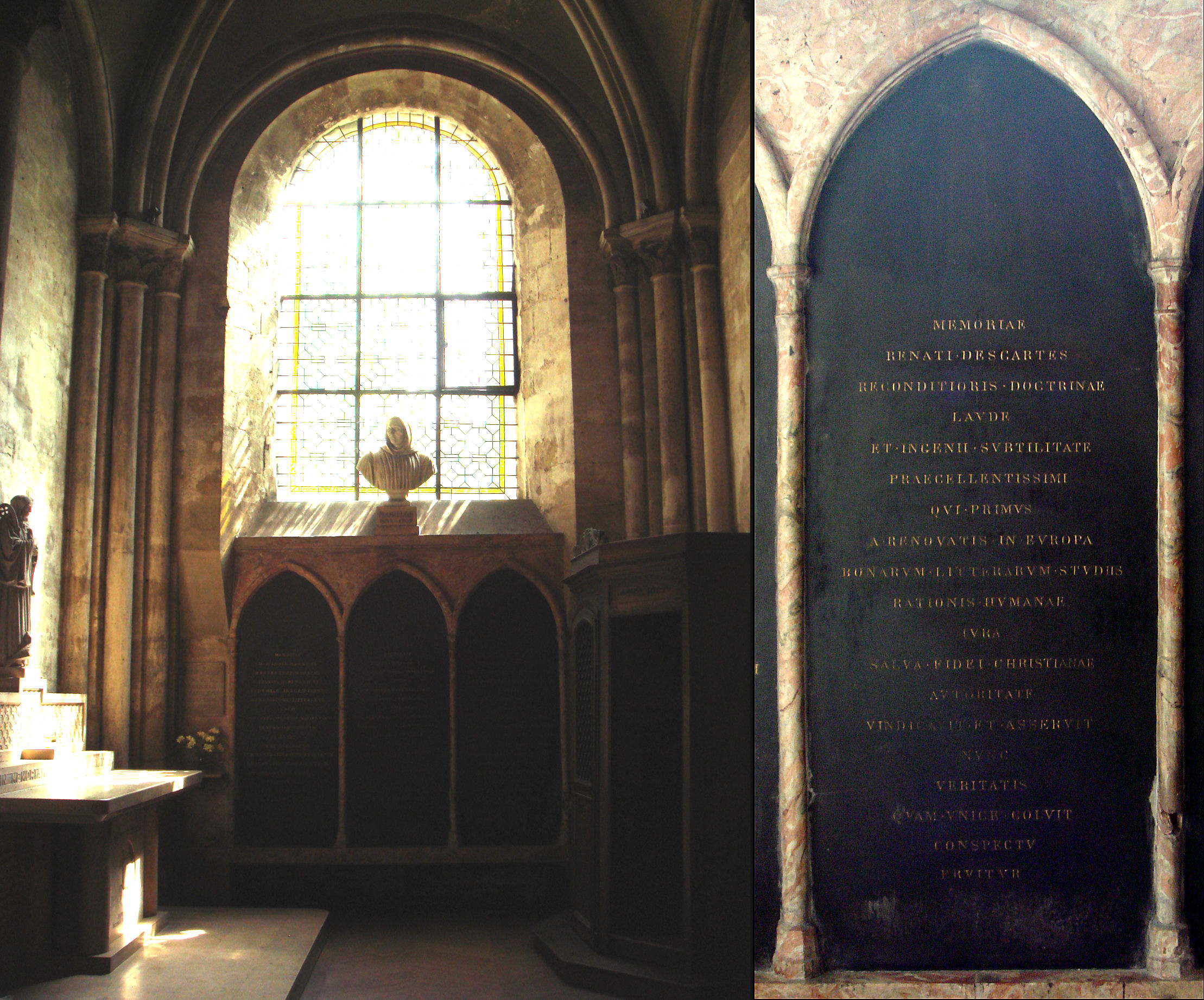
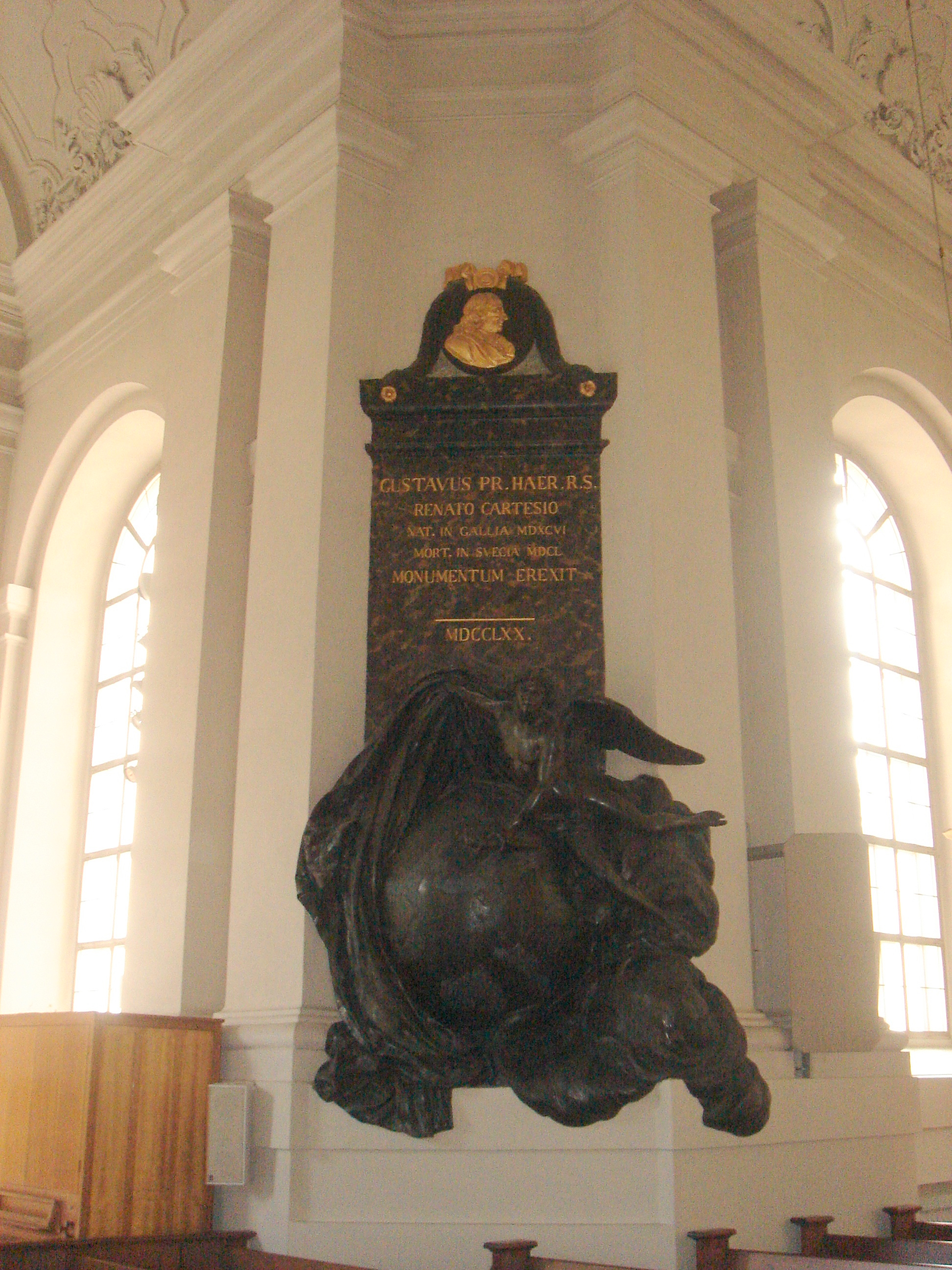
Descartes's tomb in the Abbey of Saint-Germain-des-Prés (left), its inscription (middle), and the Adolf Fredrik Church's Descartes memorial from the 1720s (right)

Descartes agreed to tutor Christina three times weekly at 5 a.m. in her cold, draughty castle, but by 15 January 1650 they had met only four or five times. They disliked each other: she rejected his mechanical philosophy, and he did not share her passion for Ancient Greek language and literature.

He contracted pneumonia and died on 11 February, though other causes have been proposed, given Descartes's controversial reputation amid the European wars of religion. He was buried among orphans at what is now Adolf Fredrik Church in Stockholm. His papers passed to Chanut's Catholic brother-in-law Claude Clerselier, who selectively edited his letters to portray him as a saint.

In 1666, his remains were moved to France's Saint-Étienne-du-Mont, and in 1671, Louis XIV banned Cartesian lectures. In 1792, the National Convention planned to transfer Descartes to the Panthéon. But in 1819, minus a finger and his skull, he was reburied in the Abbey of Saint-Germain-des-Prés, though his remains have been removed. The skull at Paris's Musée de l'Homme may be a forgery. The original was likely divided in Sweden, with pieces passed among private collectors and institutions, including the University of Lund.

== Philosophy ==
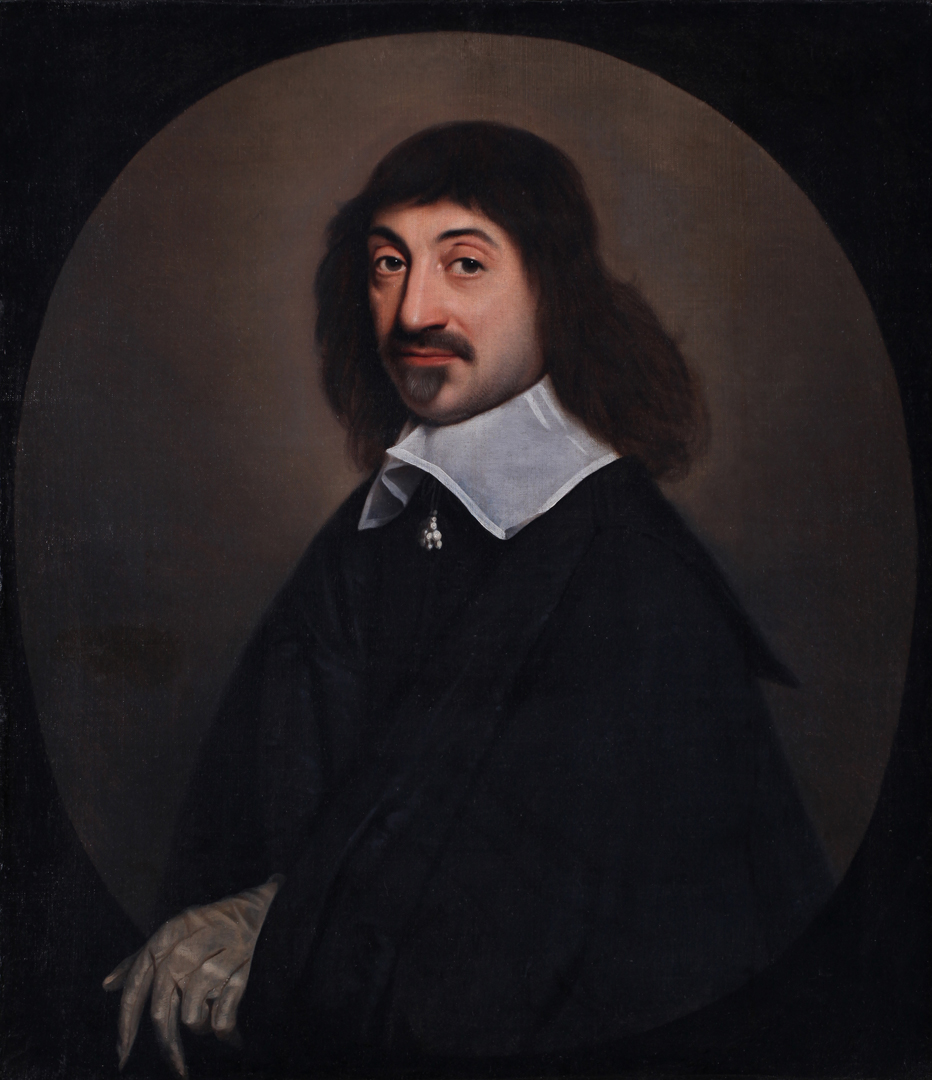
Portrait of René Descartes by Pieter Nason (1647)

In his Discourse on the Method, he attempts to arrive at a fundamental set of principles that one can know as true without any doubt. To achieve this, he employed a method called hyperbolic or metaphysical doubt, also sometimes referred to as methodological skepticism or Cartesian doubt: he rejected any ideas that can be doubted and then re-established them in order to acquire a firm foundation for genuine knowledge. He relates this to architecture: the top soil is taken away to create a new building or structure. Descartes calls his doubt the soil and new knowledge the buildings. To Descartes, Aristotle's foundationalism was incomplete and his method of doubt enhances foundationalism.

Initially, Descartes arrives at only a single first principle: he thinks. This is expressed in the Latin phrase in his Discourse on the Method, "Cogito, ergo sum", originally written in French as "Je pense, donc je suis" ("I think, therefore I am"). Descartes concluded, if he doubted, then something or someone must be doing the doubting; therefore, the very fact that he doubted proved his existence. "The simple meaning of the phrase is that if one is skeptical of existence, that is in and of itself proof that he does exist." These two first principles—I think and I exist—were later confirmed by Descartes's clear and distinct perception (delineated in his Third Meditation from The Meditations): as he clearly and distinctly perceives these two principles, Descartes reasoned, ensures their indubitability.

Descartes concludes that he can be certain that he exists because he thinks, but perceiving his body through the use of the senses is an unreliable evidence. So Descartes determines that the only indubitable knowledge is that he is a thinking thing. Thinking is what he does, and his power must come from his essence. Descartes defines "thought" (cogitatio) as "what happens in me such that I am immediately conscious of it, insofar as I am conscious of it". Thinking is thus every activity of a person of which the person is immediately conscious. He gave reasons for thinking that waking thoughts are distinguishable from dreams, and that one's mind cannot have been "hijacked" by an evil demon placing an illusory external world before one's senses.

And so something that I thought I was seeing with my eyes is grasped solely by the faculty of judgment which is in my mind.

In this manner, Descartes proceeds to construct a system of knowledge, discarding perception as unreliable and, instead, admitting only deduction as a method.

=== Mind–body dualism ===
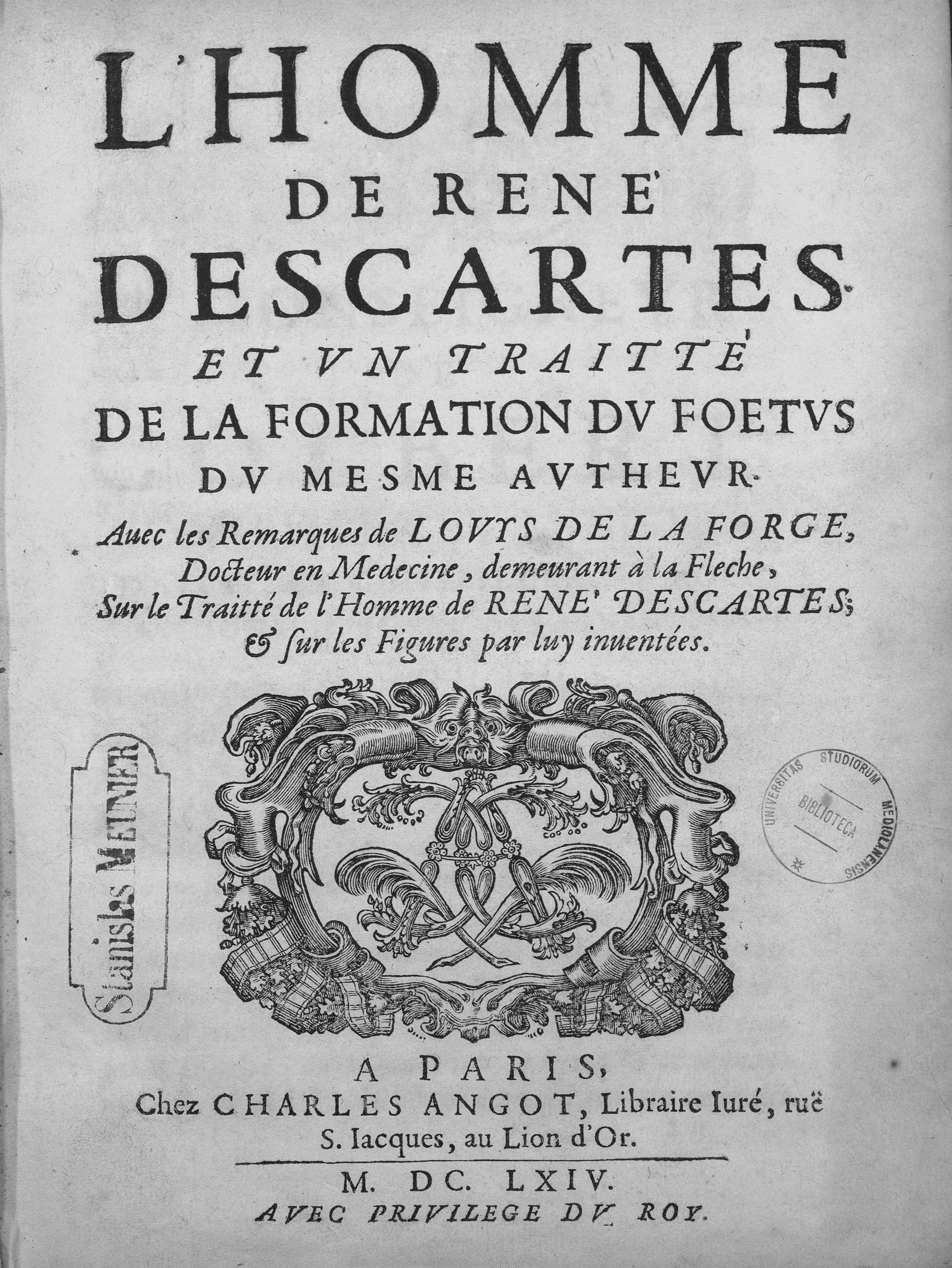
L'homme (1664)

Descartes, influenced by the automatons on display at the Château de Saint-Germain-en-Laye near Paris, investigated the connection between mind and body, and how they interact. His main influences for dualism were theology and physics. The theory on the dualism of mind and body is Descartes's signature doctrine and permeates other theories he advanced. Known as Cartesian dualism (or mind–body dualism), his theory on the separation between the mind and the body went on to influence subsequent Western philosophies. In Meditations on First Philosophy, Descartes attempted to demonstrate the existence of God and the distinction between the human soul and the body. Humans are a union of mind and body; thus Descartes's dualism embraced the idea that mind and body are distinct but closely joined. While many contemporary readers of Descartes found the distinction between mind and body difficult to grasp, he thought it was entirely straightforward. Descartes employed the concept of modes, which are the ways in which substances exist. In Principles of Philosophy, Descartes explained, "we can clearly perceive a substance apart from the mode which we say differs from it, whereas we cannot, conversely, understand the mode apart from the substance". To perceive a mode apart from its substance requires an intellectual abstraction, which Descartes explained as follows:

The intellectual abstraction consists in my turning my thought away from one part of the contents of this richer idea the better to apply it to the other part with greater attention. Thus, when I consider a shape without thinking of the substance or the extension whose shape it is, I make a mental abstraction.

According to Descartes, two substances are really distinct when each of them can exist apart from the other. Thus, Descartes reasoned that God is distinct from humans, and the body and mind of a human are also distinct from one another. He argued that the great differences between body (an extended thing) and mind (an un-extended, immaterial thing) make the two ontologically distinct. According to Descartes's indivisibility argument, the mind is utterly indivisible: because "when I consider the mind, or myself in so far as I am merely a thinking thing, I am unable to distinguish any part within myself; I understand myself to be something quite single and complete."

Moreover, in the Meditations, Descartes discusses a piece of wax and exposes the single most characteristic doctrine of Cartesian dualism: that the universe contained two radically different kinds of substances—the mind or soul defined as thinking, and the body defined as matter and unthinking. The Aristotelian philosophy of Descartes's day held that the universe was inherently purposeful or teleological. Everything that happened, be it the motion of the stars or the growth of a tree, was supposedly explainable by a certain purpose, goal or end that worked its way out within nature. Aristotle called this the "final cause", and these final causes were indispensable for explaining the ways nature operated. Descartes's theory of dualism supports the distinction between traditional Aristotelian science and the new science of Kepler and Galileo, which denied the role of a divine power and "final causes" in its attempts to explain nature. Descartes's dualism provided the philosophical rationale for the latter by expelling the final cause from the physical universe (or res extensa) in favor of the mind (or res cogitans). Therefore, while Cartesian dualism paved the way for modern physics, it also held the door open for religious beliefs about the immortality of the soul.

Descartes's dualism of mind and matter implied a concept of human beings. A human was, according to Descartes, a composite entity of mind and body. Descartes gave priority to the mind and argued that the mind could exist without the body, but the body could not exist without the mind. In the Meditations, Descartes even argues that while the mind is a substance, the body is composed only of "accidents". But he did argue that mind and body are closely joined:

Nature also teaches me, by the sensations of pain, hunger, thirst and so on, that I am not merely present in my body as a pilot in his ship, but that I am very closely joined and, as it were, intermingled with it, so that I and the body form a unit. If this were not so, I, who am nothing but a thinking thing, would not feel pain when the body was hurt, but would perceive the damage purely by the intellect, just as a sailor perceives by sight if anything in his ship is broken.

Descartes's discussion on embodiment raised one of the most perplexing problems of his dualism philosophy: What exactly is the relationship of union between the mind and the body of a person? Therefore, Cartesian dualism set the agenda for philosophical discussion of the mind–body problem for many years after Descartes's death. Descartes argued the theory of innate knowledge and that all humans were born with knowledge through the higher power of God. It was this theory of innate knowledge that was later combated by philosopher John Locke (1632–1704), an empiricist.

=== Physiology and psychology ===
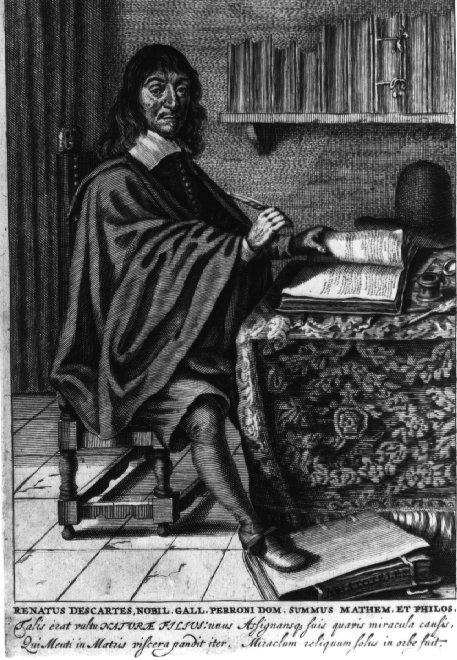
René Descartes at work

In The Passions of the Soul, published in 1649, Descartes discussed the common contemporary belief that the human body contained animal spirits. These animal spirits were believed to be light and roaming fluids circulating rapidly around the nervous system between the brain and the muscles. These animal spirits were believed to affect the human soul, or the passions of the soul. Descartes distinguished six basic passions: wonder, love, hatred, desire, joy and sadness. All of these passions, he argued, represented different combinations of the original spirit and influenced the soul to will or want certain actions. He argued, for example, that fear is a passion that moves the soul to generate a response in the body. In line with his dualist teachings on the separation between the soul and the body, he hypothesized that some part of the brain served as a connector between the soul and the body and singled out the pineal gland as connector. Descartes argued that signals passed from the ear and the eye to the pineal gland, through animal spirits. Thus, different motions in the gland cause various animal spirits. He argued that these motions in the pineal gland are based on God's will and that humans are supposed to want and like things that are useful to them. But he also argued that the animal spirits that moved around the body could distort the commands from the pineal gland, thus humans had to learn how to control their passions.

Descartes advanced a theory on automatic bodily reactions to external events, which influenced 19th-century reflex theory. He argued that external motions, such as touch and sound, reach the endings of the nerves and affect the animal spirits. For example, heat from fire affects a spot on the skin and sets in motion a chain of reactions, with the animal spirits reaching the brain through the central nervous system, and in turn, animal spirits are sent back to the muscles to move the hand away from the fire. Through this chain of reactions, the automatic reactions of the body do not require a thought process.

Above all, he was among the first scientists who believed that the soul should be subject to scientific investigation. He challenged the views of his contemporaries that the soul was divine, thus religious authorities regarded his books as dangerous. Descartes's writings went on to form the basis for theories on emotions and how cognitive evaluations were translated into affective processes. Descartes believed the brain resembled a working machine and that mathematics and mechanics could explain complicated processes in it.

=== On animals ===
It is generally accepted that Descartes denied that animals had reason or intelligence, as historians have generally reduced Descartes's interpretation of animals to a comparison to machines. At a deeper reading, however, questions surface and his interpretation appears more complex: he argued that animals did not lack sensations or perceptions, but these could be explained mechanistically, that is, without any appeals to souls. A more attentive investigation of Descartes's study of animals, and their variety, reveals his attention to animal behaviour, an unexpected outcome of his mechanical interpretation. Whereas humans had a soul, or mind, and were able to feel pain and anxiety, animals by virtue of not having a soul could not feel pain or anxiety. If animals showed signs of distress, then this was to protect the body from damage, but the innate state needed for them to suffer was absent. Although Descartes's views were not universally accepted, they became prominent in Europe and North America, allowing humans to treat animals with impunity. The view that animals were quite separate from humanity and merely machines allowed for the maltreatment of animals, and was sanctioned in law and societal norms until the middle of the 19th century. The publications of Charles Darwin would eventually erode the Cartesian view of animals. Darwin argued that the continuity between humans and other species suggested the possibility of animal suffering.

=== Moral philosophy ===
For Descartes, ethics was a science, the highest and most perfect of them. Like the rest of the sciences, ethics had its roots in metaphysics. In this way, he argues for the existence of God, investigates the place of man in nature, formulates the theory of mind–body dualism, and defends free will. However, as he was a convinced rationalist, Descartes clearly states that reason is sufficient in the search for the goods that individuals should seek, and virtue consists in the correct reasoning that should guide their actions. Nevertheless, the quality of this reasoning depends on knowledge and mental condition. For this reason, he said that a complete moral philosophy should include the study of the body. He discussed this subject in the correspondence with Princess Elisabeth of Bohemia, and as a result wrote his work The Passions of the Soul, that contains a study of the psychosomatic processes and reactions in man, with an emphasis on emotions or passions. His works about human passion and emotion would be the basis for the philosophy of his followers, and would have a lasting impact on ideas concerning what literature and art should be, specifically how it should invoke emotion.

The moral writings of Descartes came at the last part of his life, but earlier, in his Discourse on the Method, he adopted three maxims to be able to act while he put all his ideas into doubt. Those maxims are known as his "Provisional Morals".

=== God ===
In the third and fifth Meditation, Descartes offers proofs of a benevolent God (the trademark argument and the ontological argument respectively). Descartes has faith in the account of reality his senses provide him, since he believed that God provided him with a working mind and sensory system and does not desire to deceive him. From this supposition, however, Descartes finally establishes the possibility of acquiring knowledge about the world based on deduction and perception. Regarding epistemology, therefore, Descartes can be said to have contributed such ideas as a conception of foundationalism and the possibility that reason is the only reliable method of attaining knowledge. Descartes, however, was very much aware that experimentation was necessary to verify and validate theories.

Descartes invokes his causal adequacy principle to support his trademark argument for the existence of God, quoting Lucretius in defence: "Ex nihilo nihil fit", meaning "Nothing comes from nothing". The argument is "that our idea of perfection is related to its perfect origin (God), just as a stamp or trademark is left in an article of workmanship by its maker." In the fifth Meditation, Descartes presents a version of the ontological argument which is founded on the possibility of thinking the "idea of a being that is supremely perfect and infinite", and suggests that "of all the ideas that are in me, the idea that I have of God is the most true, the most clear and distinct".

Descartes's attempt to ground theological beliefs on reason encountered intense opposition in his time. Pascal regarded Descartes's views as a rationalist and mechanist, and accused him of deism: "I cannot forgive Descartes; in all his philosophy, Descartes did his best to dispense with God. But Descartes could not avoid prodding God to set the world in motion with a snap of his lordly fingers; after that, he had no more use for God", while a contemporary, Martin Schoock, accused him of atheist beliefs, though Descartes had provided an explicit critique of atheism in his Meditations. In 1663, the Catholic Church placed Descartes's works on the Index of Prohibited Books.

Descartes also wrote a response to external world skepticism. Through this method of skepticism, he does not doubt for the sake of doubting but to achieve concrete and reliable information. In other words, certainty. He argues that sensory perceptions come to him involuntarily, and are not willed by him. They are external to his senses, and according to Descartes, this is evidence of the existence of something outside of his mind, and thus, an external world. Descartes goes on to argue that the things in the external world are material by arguing that God would not deceive him as to the ideas that are being transmitted, and that God has given him the "propensity" to believe that such ideas are caused by material things. Descartes also believes a substance is something that does not need any assistance to function or exist. Descartes further explains how only God can be a true "substance". But minds are substances, meaning they need only God for them to function. The mind is a thinking substance. The means for a thinking substance stem from ideas.

Descartes steered clear of theological questions, restricting his attention to showing that there is no incompatibility between his metaphysics and theological orthodoxy. He avoided trying to demonstrate theological dogmas metaphysically. When challenged that he had not established the immortality of the soul merely in showing that the soul and the body are distinct substances, he replied, "I do not take it upon myself to try to use the power of human reason to settle any of those matters which depend on the free will of God".

== Mathematics ==
=== x for unknown; exponential notation ===
Descartes "invented the convention of representing unknowns in equations by x, y, and z, and knowns by a, b, and c". He also "pioneered the standard notation" that uses superscripts to show the powers or exponents; for example, the superscript 2 used in x^{2} to indicate x squared.

=== Analytic geometry ===
A Cartesian coordinates graph, using his invented x and y axes

One of Descartes's most enduring legacies was his development – together with Pierre de Fermat – of Cartesian or analytic geometry, which uses algebra to describe geometry; the Cartesian coordinate system is named after him. Descartes's work on geometry was written to demonstrate its application to correct reasoning he discussed in the Discourse on the Method, which consists of reasoning based on self-evident principles. He was the first to assign a fundamental place for algebra in the system of knowledge, using it as a method to automate or mechanize reasoning, particularly about abstract, unknown quantities.

Both Descartes and Fermat were inspired by the works of the Ancient Greek mathematicians Pappus of Alexandria and Apollonius of Perga, especially by their techniques of analysis. Crucial for their work was also the symbolic algebra of François Viète. The step that their predecessors failed to take was using coordinates to study the relationship between geometry and algebra.

European mathematicians had previously viewed geometry as a more fundamental form of mathematics, serving as the foundation of algebra. Algebraic rules were given geometric proofs by mathematicians such as Pacioli, Cardano, Tartaglia and Ferrari. Equations of degree higher than the third were regarded as unreal, because a three-dimensional form, such as a cube, occupied the largest dimension of reality. Descartes professed that the abstract quantity a^{2} could represent length as well as an area. This was in opposition to the teachings of mathematicians such as François Viète, who insisted that a second power must represent an area.

Although Descartes did not pursue the subject, he preceded Gottfried Wilhelm Leibniz in envisioning a more general science of algebra or "universal mathematics", as a precursor to symbolic logic, that could encompass logical principles and methods symbolically, and mechanize general reasoning.

=== Influence on Newton's mathematics ===
It is often said that Descartes had the most influence of anyone on the young Isaac Newton. Descartes's influence did not extend directly from his original French edition of La Géométrie, rather from Frans van Schooten's expanded second Latin edition of the work. Newton continued Descartes's work on cubic equations, which freed the subject from the fetters of the Greek perspectives. The most important concept was his very modern treatment of single variables.

==== The basis of calculus ====
Descartes's work provided the basis for the calculus developed by Leibniz and Newton, who applied the infinitesimal calculus to the tangent line problem, thus permitting the evolution of that branch of modern mathematics. His rule of signs is also a commonly used method to determine the number of positive and negative roots of a polynomial.

== Physics ==
=== Mechanics ===
==== Mechanical philosophy ====
The beginning of Descartes's interest in physics is accredited to the amateur scientist and mathematician Isaac Beeckman, whom he met in 1618, and who was at the forefront of a new school of thought known as mechanical philosophy. With this foundation of reasoning, Descartes formulated many of his theories on mechanical and geometric physics. It is said that they met when both were looking at a placard that was set up in the Breda marketplace, detailing a mathematical problem to be solved. Descartes asked Beeckman to translate the problem from Dutch to French. In their following meetings Beeckman interested Descartes in his corpuscularian approach to mechanical theory, and convinced him to devote his studies to a mathematical approach to nature. In 1628, Beeckman also introduced him to many of Galileo's ideas. Together, they worked on free fall, catenaries, conic sections, and fluid statics. Both believed that it was necessary to create a method that thoroughly linked mathematics and physics.

Descartes's mechanical attempt to study nature reveals success and shortcomings. He managed to explain rather well the functioning of so-called inert phenomena, such as the rainbow, the phenomenon of mock suns, the movement of planets and comets, as well as the differentiation of metals, stones and minerals. This experimental work with metals and inert bodies reveals a different Descartes, investigating nature by means of observations and the uses of microscopes. But there is more, as Descartes tried to explain in the mechanical terms of his philosophy living nature too – namely, plants and animals. This part shows the complexity of his philosophical programme, but also the most fascinating. On the one hand, Descartes managed to lay the ground for a modern medicine, while on the other hand he failed to establish an overall science of nature. Recently, historians have recognized the importance of Descartes's scientific enterprise in his philosophical work.

==== Anticipating the concept of work ====
Although the concept of work (in physics) was not formally used until 1826, similar concepts existed before then. In 1637, Descartes wrote:

Lifting 100 lb one foot twice over is the same as lifting 200 lb one foot, or 100 lb two feet.

==== Conservation of motion ====
In Principles of Philosophy (Latin: Principia Philosophiae) from 1644, Descartes outlined his views on the universe. In it he describes his three laws of motion. (Newton's own laws of motion would later be modeled on Descartes's exposition.) Descartes defined "quantity of motion" (Latin: quantitas motus) as the product of size and speed, and claimed that the total quantity of motion in the universe is conserved.

If x is twice the size of y, and is moving half as fast, then there's the same amount of motion in each.

[God] created matter, along with its motion ... merely by letting things run their course, he preserves the same amount of motion ... as he put there in the beginning.

Descartes had discovered an early form of the law of conservation of momentum. He envisioned the quantity of motion as pertaining to motion in a straight line, as opposed to perfect circular motion, as Galileo had envisioned it. Descartes's discovery should not be seen as the modern law of conservation of momentum, since it had no concept of mass as distinct from weight or size, and since he believed that it is speed rather than velocity that is conserved.

==== Plenism ====
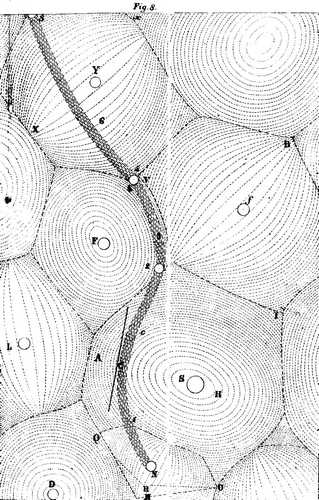
René Descartes's aether vortices around celestial bodies

Descartes was also a devoted "plenist" who believed that no empty space can exist and that space must consequently be filled with matter. The parts of this matter tend to move in straight paths, but because they lie close together, they cannot move freely, which according to Descartes implies that every motion is circular, so the aether is filled with vortices. Descartes also distinguishes between different forms and sizes of matter, in which rough matter resists the circular movement more strongly than fine matter. Due to centrifugal force, matter tends towards the outer edges of the vortex, which causes a condensation of this matter there. The rough matter cannot follow this movement due to its greater inertia – so due to the pressure of the condensed outer matter, those parts will be pushed into the centre of the vortex. According to Descartes, this inward pressure is nothing other than gravity. He compared this mechanism with the fact that if a rotating, liquid-filled vessel is stopped, the liquid goes on to rotate. Now, if one drops small pieces of light matter (e.g. wood) into the vessel, the pieces move to the middle of the vessel.

=== Magnetism ===
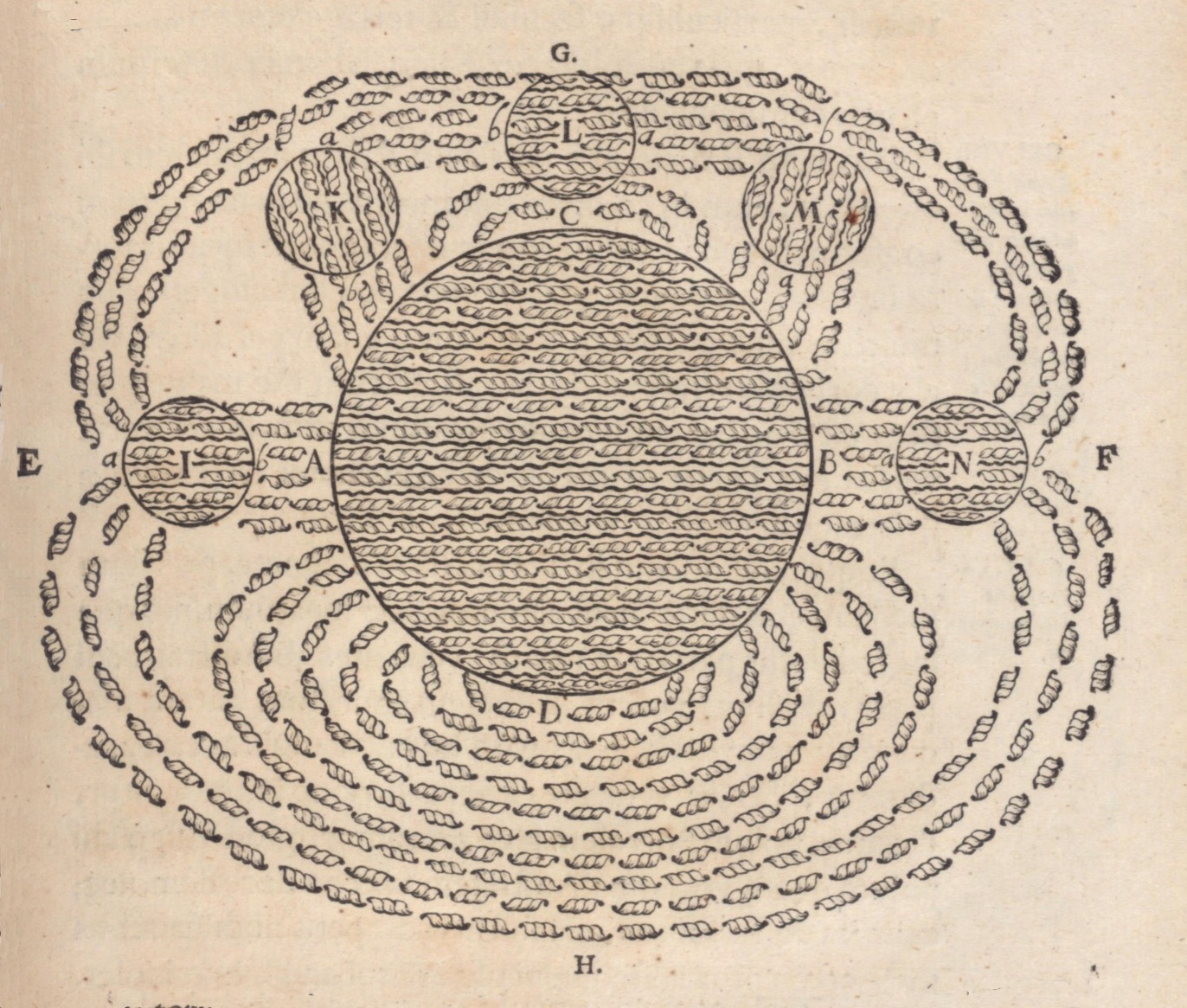
Descartes's 1664 diagram of effluvia emitted by magnets. It is a predecessor of the concept of magnetic field.

Descartes proposed a theory to explain magnetism and explain the observation in De Magnete by William Gilbert. Descartes considered that 'effluvia' were emitted by a magnet, the effluvia rarefied the air, creating pressure differences and thus forces.

=== Glass science ===
In 1644, Descartes provided one of the earliest microscopic theories of glass. He considered that glass was formed by particles frozen in motion after heated. He also provides one of the earliest understanding of the role of stress and its relief by annealing.

=== Optics ===
Descartes also made contributions to the field of optics. He showed by using geometric construction and the law of refraction (also known as Descartes's law in France, or more commonly Snell's law elsewhere) that the angular radius of a rainbow is 42 degrees (i.e., the angle subtended at the eye by the edge of the rainbow and the ray passing from the sun through the rainbow's centre is 42°). He also independently discovered the law of reflection, and his essay on optics was the first published mention of this law.

== Meteorology ==
Within Discourse on the Method, there is an appendix in which Descartes discusses his theories on meteorology known as Les Météores. He first proposed the idea that the elements were made up of small particles that join together imperfectly, thus leaving small spaces in between. These spaces were then filled with smaller much quicker "subtile matter". These particles were different based on what element they constructed, for example, Descartes believed that particles of water were "like little eels, which, though they join and twist around each other, do not, for all that, ever knot or hook together in such a way that they cannot easily be separated". In contrast, the particles that made up the more solid material, were constructed in a way that generated irregular shapes. The size of the particle also matters; if the particle was smaller, not only was it faster and constantly moving, it was more easily agitated by the larger particles, which were slow but had more force. The different qualities, such as combinations and shapes, gave rise to different secondary qualities of materials, such as temperature. This first idea is the basis for the rest of Descartes's theory on meteorology.

While rejecting most of Aristotle's theories on meteorology, he still kept some of the terminology that Aristotle used such as vapors and exhalations. These "vapors" would be drawn into the sky by the sun from "terrestrial substances" and would generate wind. Descartes also theorized that falling clouds would displace the air below them, also generating wind. Falling clouds could also generate thunder. He theorized that when a cloud rests above another cloud and the air around the top cloud is hot, it condenses the vapor around the top cloud, and causes the particles to fall. When the particles falling from the top cloud collided with the bottom cloud's particles it would create thunder. He compared his theory on thunder to his theory on avalanches. Descartes believed that the booming sound that avalanches created, was due to snow that was heated, and therefore heavier, falling onto the snow that was below it. This theory was supported by experience: "It follows that one can understand why it thunders more rarely in winter than in summer; for then not enough heat reaches the highest clouds, in order to break them up."

Another theory that Descartes had was on the production of lightning. Descartes believed that lightning was caused by exhalations trapped between the two colliding clouds. He believed that in order to make these exhalations viable to produce lightning, they had to be made "fine and inflammable" by hot and dry weather. Whenever the clouds would collide, it would cause them to ignite, creating lightning; if the cloud above was heavier than the bottom cloud, it would also produce thunder.

Descartes also believed that clouds were made up of drops of water and ice, and believed that rain would fall whenever the air could no longer support them. It would fall as snow if the air was not warm enough to melt the raindrops. And hail was when the cloud drops would melt, and then freeze again because cold air would refreeze them.

Descartes did not use mathematics or instruments (as there were not any at the time) to back up his theories on Meteorology and instead used qualitative reasoning in order to deduce his hypothesis.

== Historical impact ==
=== Emancipation from Church doctrine ===
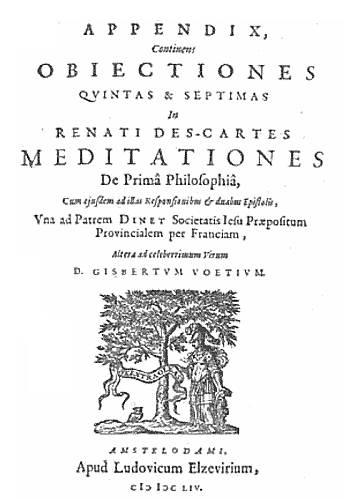
Cover of Meditations

Descartes has often been dubbed the father of modern Western philosophy, the thinker whose approaches have profoundly changed the course of Western philosophy and set the basis for modernity. The first two of his Meditations on First Philosophy, those that formulate the famous methodic doubt, represent the portion of Descartes's writings that most influenced modern thinking. It has been argued that Descartes himself did not realize the extent of this revolutionary move. In shifting the debate from "what is true" to "of what can I be certain?", Descartes arguably shifted the authoritative guarantor of truth from God to humanity – while the traditional concept of "truth" implies an external authority, "certainty" instead relies on the judgment of the individual.

In an anthropocentric revolution, the human being is now raised to the level of a subject, an agent, an emancipated being equipped with autonomous reason. This was a revolutionary step that contributed to the basis of the Modern Era, the repercussions of which are still being felt: the emancipation of humanity from Christian revelational truth and Church doctrine; humanity making its own law and taking its own stand. In modernity, the guarantor of truth is not God anymore but human beings, each of whom is a "self-conscious shaper and guarantor" of their own reality. In that way, each person is turned into a reasoning adult, a subject and agent, as opposed to a child obedient to God. This change in perspective was characteristic of the shift from the Christian medieval period to the modern period, a shift that had been anticipated in other fields, and which was now being formulated in the field of philosophy by Descartes.

This anthropocentric perspective of Descartes's work, establishing human reason as autonomous, provided the basis for the Enlightenment's emancipation from God and the Church. According to Martin Heidegger, the perspective of Descartes's work also provided the basis for all subsequent anthropology. Descartes's philosophical revolution is sometimes said to have sparked modern anthropocentrism and subjectivism.

=== Reception ===
The Discourse appeared during Descartes's lifetime in a single edition of 500 copies, 200 of which were set aside for the author. Sharing a similar fate was the only French edition of the Meditations, which had not managed to sell out by the time of Descartes's death. A concomitant Latin edition of the latter was, however, eagerly sought out by Europe's scholarly community and proved a commercial success for Descartes.

Although Descartes was well known in academic circles towards the end of his life, the teaching of his works in schools was controversial. Henri de Roy (Henricus Regius, 1598–1679), Professor of Medicine at the University of Utrecht, was condemned by the Rector of the university, Gijsbert Voet (Voetius), for teaching Descartes's physics.

According to philosophy professor John Cottingham, Descartes's Meditations on First Philosophy is considered to be "one of the key texts of Western philosophy". Cottingham said that the Meditations is the "most widely studied of all Descartes's writings". According to author Anthony Gottlieb, one of the reasons Descartes and Thomas Hobbes continue to be debated in the modern era is that they still have something to say to us that remains relevant on questions such as, "What does the advance of science entail for our understanding of ourselves and our ideas of God?" and "How is government to deal with religious diversity?"

== Works ==
=== Writings ===
- 1618. Musicae Compendium. A treatise on music theory and the aesthetics of music, which Descartes dedicated to early collaborator Isaac Beeckman (written in 1618, first published—posthumously—in 1650).
- 1626–1628. Regulae ad directionem ingenii (Rules for the Direction of the Mind). Incomplete. First published posthumously in Dutch translation in 1684 and in the original Latin at Amsterdam in 1701 (R. Des-Cartes Opuscula Posthuma Physica et Mathematica). The best critical edition, which includes the Dutch translation of 1684, is edited by Giovanni Crapulli (The Hague: Martinus Nijhoff, 1966).
- c. 1630. De solidorum elementis. Concerns the classification of Platonic solids and three-dimensional figurate numbers. Said by some scholars to prefigure Euler's polyhedral formula. Unpublished; discovered in Descartes's estate in Stockholm in 1650, soaked for three days in the Seine in a shipwreck while being shipped back to Paris, copied in 1676 by Leibniz, and lost. Leibniz's copy, also lost, was rediscovered circa 1860 in Hannover.
- 1630–1631. La recherche de la vérité par la lumière naturelle (The Search for Truth by Natural Light) unfinished dialogue published in 1701.
- 1630–1633. Le Monde (The World) and L'Homme (Man). Descartes's first systematic presentation of his natural philosophy. Man was published posthumously in Latin translation in 1662; and The World posthumously in 1664.
- 1637. Discours de la méthode (Discourse on the Method). An introduction to the Essais, which include La Dioptrique, Les Météores and La Géométrie.
- 1637. La Géométrie (Geometry). Descartes's major work in mathematics. There is an English translation by Michael Mahoney (New York: Dover, 1979).
- 1641. Meditationes de prima philosophia (Meditations on First Philosophy), also known as Metaphysical Meditations. In Latin; a second edition, published the following year, included an additional objection and reply, and a Letter to Dinet. A French translation by the Duke of Luynes, probably done without Descartes's supervision, was published in 1647. Includes six Objections and Replies.
- 1644. Principia philosophiae (Principles of Philosophy), a Latin textbook at first intended by Descartes to replace the Aristotelian textbooks then used in universities. A French translation, Principes de philosophie by Claude Picot, under the supervision of Descartes, appeared in 1647 with a letter-preface to Princess Elisabeth of Bohemia.
- 1647. Notae in programma (Comments on a Certain Broadsheet). A reply to Descartes's one-time disciple Henricus Regius.
- 1648. La description du corps humain (The Description of the Human Body). Published posthumously by Clerselier in 1664.
- 1648. Responsiones Renati Des Cartes... (Conversation with Burman). Notes on a Q&A session between Descartes and Frans Burman on 16 April 1648. Rediscovered in 1895 and published for the first time in 1896. An annotated bilingual edition (Latin with French translation), edited by Jean-Marie Beyssade, was published in 1981 (Paris: PUF).
- 1649. Les passions de l'âme (Passions of the Soul). Dedicated to Princess Elisabeth of the Palatinate.
- 1657. Correspondance (three volumes: 1657, 1659, 1667). Published by Descartes's literary executor Claude Clerselier. The third edition, in 1667, was the most complete; Clerselier omitted, however, much of the material pertaining to mathematics.

In January 2010, a previously unknown letter from Descartes, dated 27 May 1641, was found by the Dutch philosopher Erik-Jan Bos when browsing through Google. Bos found the letter mentioned in a summary of autographs kept by Haverford College in Haverford, Pennsylvania. The college was unaware that the letter had never been published. This was the third letter by Descartes found in the last 25 years.

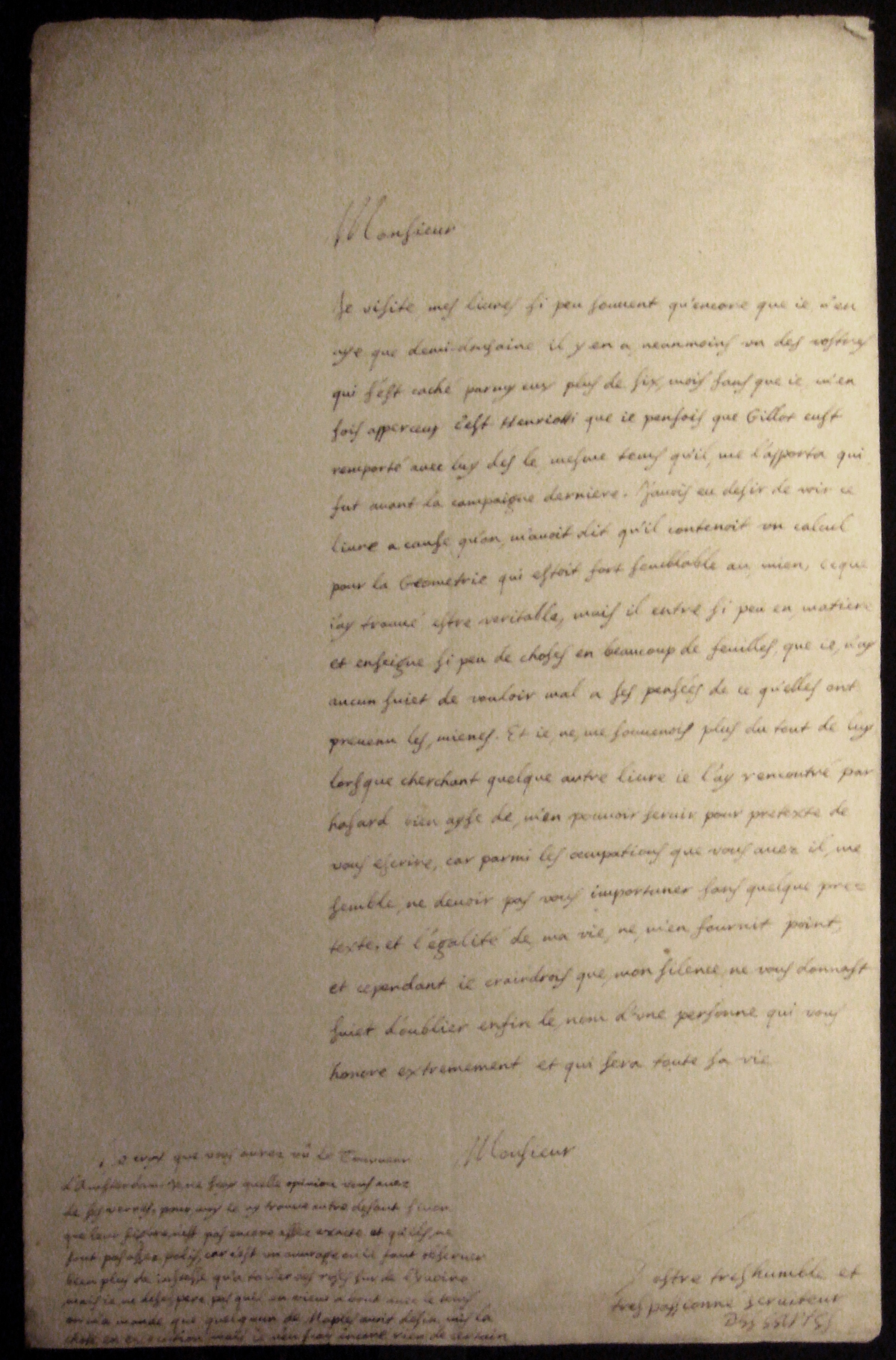
Handwritten letter by Descartes, December 1638

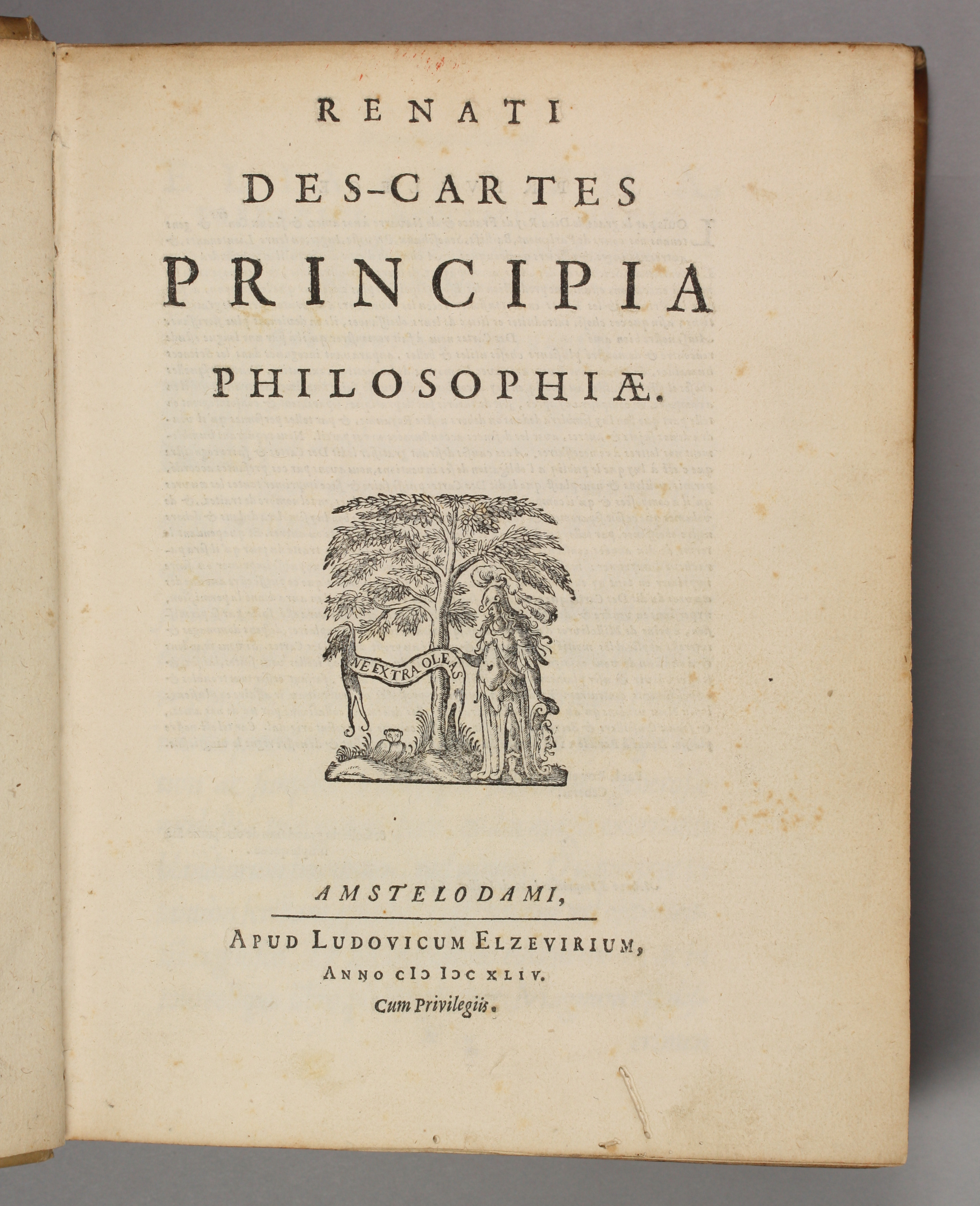
Principia philosophiae, 1644

=== Collected editions ===
- Oeuvres de Descartes edited by Charles Adam and Paul Tannery, Paris: Léopold Cerf, 1897–1913, 13 volumes; new revised edition, Paris: Vrin-CNRS, 1964–1974, 11 volumes (the first five volumes contain the correspondence). [This edition is traditionally cited with the initials AT (for Adam and Tannery) followed by a volume number in Roman numerals; thus AT VII refers to Oeuvres de Descartes volume 7.]
- Étude du bon sens, La recherche de la vérité et autres écrits de jeunesse (1616–1631) edited by Vincent Carraud and Gilles Olivo, Paris: PUF, 2013.
- Descartes, Œuvres complètes, new edition by Jean-Marie Beyssade and Denis Kambouchner, Paris: Gallimard, published volumes:
  - I: Premiers écrits. Règles pour la direction de l'esprit, 2016.
  - III: Discours de la Méthode et Essais, 2009.
  - VIII.1: Correspondance, 1 edited by Jean-Robert Armogathe, 2013.
  - VIII.2: Correspondance, 2 edited by Jean-Robert Armogathe, 2013.
- René Descartes. Opere 1637–1649, Milano, Bompiani, 2009, pp. 2531. Edizione integrale (di prime edizioni) e traduzione italiana a fronte, a cura di G. Belgioioso con la collaborazione di I. Agostini, M. Marrone, M. Savini (transl. Complete edition (of first editions) and Italian translation, edited by G. Belgioioso with the collaboration of I. Agostini, M. Marrone, M. Savini) ISBN 978-88-452-6332-3.
- René Descartes. Opere 1650–2009, Milano, Bompiani, 2009, pp. 1723. Edizione integrale delle opere postume e traduzione italiana a fronte, a cura di G. Belgioioso con la collaborazione di I. Agostini, M. Marrone, M. Savini (transl. Complete edition of the posthumous works with an Italian translation on facing pages, edited by G. Belgioioso, with the collaboration of I. Agostini, M. Marrone, and M. Savini) ISBN 978-88-452-6333-0.
- René Descartes. Tutte le lettere 1619–1650, Milano, Bompiani, 2009 IIa ed., pp. 3104. Nuova edizione integrale dell'epistolario cartesiano con traduzione italiana a fronte, a cura di G. Belgioioso con la collaborazione di I. Agostini, M. Marrone, F.A. Meschini, M. Savini e J.-R. Armogathe (transl. New complete edition of the Cartesian correspondence, with an Italian translation on facing pages; edited by G. Belgioioso, with the collaboration of I. Agostini, M. Marrone, F.A. Meschini, M. Savini, and J.-R. Armogathe.) ISBN 978-88-452-3422-4.
- René Descartes, Isaac Beeckman, Marin Mersenne. Lettere 1619–1648, Milano, Bompiani, 2015 pp. 1696. Edizione integrale con traduzione italiana a fronte, a cura di Giulia Beglioioso e Jean Robert-Armogathe (transl. Complete edition with Italian translation on facing pages, edited by Giulia Belgioioso and Jean Robert-Armogathe) ISBN 978-88-452-8071-9.

=== Collected English translations ===
- 1955. The Philosophical Works, E. S. Haldane and G. R. T. Ross, trans. Dover Publications. This work is traditionally cited with the initials HR (for Haldane and Ross) followed by a volume number in Roman numerals; thus HR II refers to volume 2 of this edition.
- 1988. The Philosophical Writings of Descartes in 3 vols. Cottingham, J., Stoothoff, R., Kenny, A., and Murdoch, D., trans. Cambridge University Press. This work is traditionally cited with the initials CSM (for Cottingham, Stoothoff, and Murdoch) or CSMK (for Cottingham, Stoothoff, Murdoch, and Kenny) followed by a volume number in Roman numeral; thus CSM II refers to volume 2 of this edition.
- 1998. René Descartes: The World and Other Writings. Translated and edited by Stephen Gaukroger. Cambridge University Press. (This consists mainly of scientific writings, on physics, biology, astronomy, optics, etc., which were very influential in the 17th and 18th centuries, but which are routinely omitted or much abridged in modern collections of Descartes's philosophical works.)

=== Translation of single works ===
- 1628. Regulae ad directionem ingenii. Rules for the Direction of the Natural Intelligence. A Bilingual Edition of the Cartesian Treatise on Method Archived 16 August 2021 at the Wayback Machine, ed. & trans. G. Heffernan (Amsterdam/Atlanta: Rodopi, 1998).
- 1633. The World, or Treatise on Light Archived 21 June 2021 at the Wayback Machine, tr. by Michael S. Mahoney.
- 1633. Treatise of Man, tr. by T. S. Hall. Cambridge, MA: Harvard University Press, 1972.
- 1637. Discourse on the Method, Optics, Geometry and Meteorology, trans. P. J. Olscamp, Revised edition (Indianapolis: Hackett, 2001).
- 1637. The Geometry of René Descartes Archived 16 August 2021 at the Wayback Machine, trans. D. E. Smith & Marcia Latham (Chicago: Open Court, 1925).
- 1641. Meditations on First Philosophy, tr. by J. Cottingham, Cambridge: Cambridge University Press, 1996. Latin original. Alternative English title: Metaphysical Meditations. Includes six Objections and Replies. A second edition published the following year, includes an additional Objection and Reply and a Letter to Dinet. HTML Online Latin-French-English Edition Archived 27 August 2006 at the Wayback Machine.
- 1644. Principles of Philosophy Archived 30 September 2020 at the Wayback Machine, trans. V. R. Miller & R. P. Miller: (Dordrecht/Boston/London: Kluwer Academic Publishers, 1982).
- 1648. Descartes' Conversation with Burman, tr. by J. Cottingham, Oxford: Clarendon Press, 1989.
- 1649. Passions of the Soul Archived 16 August 2021 at the Wayback Machine, trans. S. H. Voss (Indianapolis: Hackett, 1989). Dedicated to Elisabeth of the Palatinate.
- 1619–1648. René Descartes, Isaac Beeckman, Marin Mersenne. Lettere 1619–1648, ed. by Giulia Beglioioso and Jean Robert-Armogathe, Milano, Bompiani, 2015 pp. 1696. ISBN 978-88-452-8071-9

== See also ==
- Bucket argument
- Cartesian circle
- Cartesian plane
- Cartesian product
- Cartesian product of graphs
- Cartesian theater
- Cartesian tree
- Descartes number
- Descartes's rule of signs
- Descartes's theorem (4 tangent circles)
- Descartes's theorem on total angular defect
- Folium of Descartes
- List of things named after René Descartes
- Tree of knowledge (philosophy)
