= Claude Clerselier =

French lawyer, editor, and translator (1614–1684)

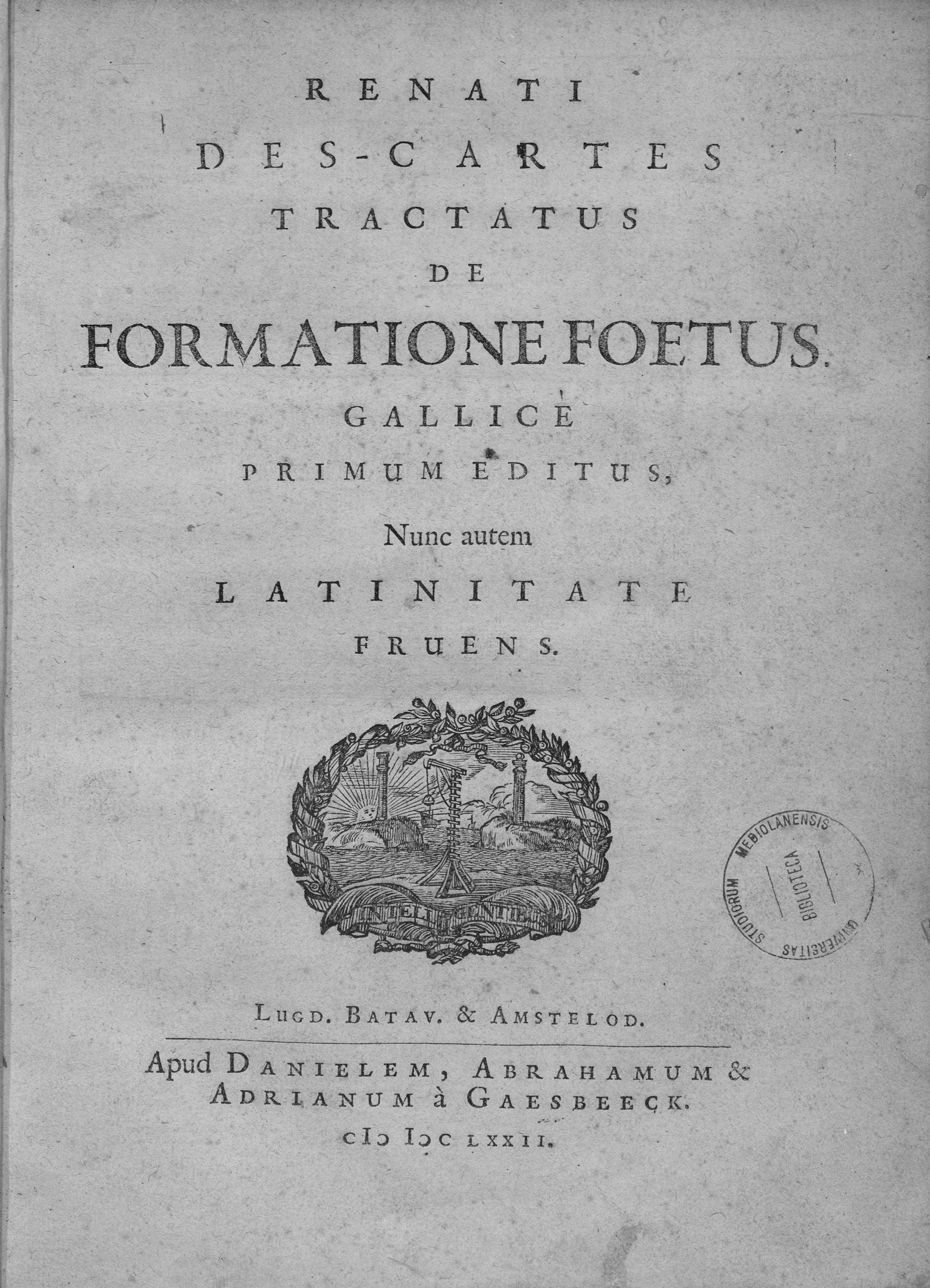
Tractatus de formatione foetus, 1672

Claude Clerselier (French: [klod klɛʁsəlje]; 1614, Paris – 1684, Paris) was a French editor and translator.

== Biography ==
Clerselier was a lawyer in the Parlement of Paris and resident for the King of France in Sweden. He was the brother-in-law of Pierre Chanut, and served as the liaison between René Descartes and Queen Christina of Sweden. He was Descartes's literary executor and edited and translated several works by Descartes, including his letters (Paris, 1657, 1659 et 1667), L'Homme, et un Traité de la formation du fœtus du mesme auteur avec les remarques de Louys de La Forge, 1664, L'Homme...et...Le Monde, 1667, and his Principes, 1681.

== Sources ==
- Delphine Antoine-Mahut, "Claude Clerselier (1614–1684)", in: The Cambridge Descartes Lexicon, Dir. Larry Nolan, Cambridge University Press, 2015.
- Trevor McClaughlin, "Claude Clerselier's Attestation of Descartes's Religious Orthodoxy" in Journal of Religious History, n° 20, June 1980, pp. 136–46.
- See also Inventaire après décès de Claude Clerselier, Archives nationales, Minutier Central, Étude XXXIX, liasse 159, 10 January 1685.
