= Trademark argument =

Argument for the existence of God

French philosopher and mathematician René Descartes, who formulated the trademark argument

The trademark argument is an a priori argument for the existence of God developed by the French philosopher and mathematician René Descartes. The name derives from the fact that the idea of God existing in each person "is the trademark, hallmark or stamp of their divine creator".

In the Meditations Descartes provides two arguments for the existence of God. In Meditation V he presents a version of the ontological argument which attempts to deduce the existence of God from the nature of God; in Meditation III he presents an argument for the existence of God from one of the effects of God's activity. Descartes cannot start with the existence of the world or with some feature of the world for, at this stage of his argument, he has not established that the world exists. Instead, he starts with the fact that he has an idea of God and concludes "that the mere fact that I exist and have within me an idea of a most perfect being, that is, God, provides a very clear proof that God indeed exists." He says, "it is no surprise that God, in creating me, should have placed this idea in me to be, as it were, the mark of the craftsman stamped on his work."

== Underlying assumptions ==
To understand Descartes' argument it is necessary to understand some of the metaphysical assumptions that Descartes is using.

=== Degrees of reality ===
Descartes says,

Undoubtedly, the ideas which represent substances to me amount to something more and, so to speak, contain within themselves more objective reality than the ideas which merely represent modes or accidents. Again, the idea that gives me my understanding of a supreme God...certainly has in it more objective reality than the ideas that represent finite substances. Now it is manifest by the natural light that there must be at least as much reality in the efficient and total cause as in the effect of that cause. For where, I ask, could the effect get its reality from, if not from the cause? And how could the cause give it to the effect unless it possessed it? It follows from this both that something cannot arise from nothing, and also that what is more perfect—that is, contains in itself more reality—cannot arise from what is less perfect.

Descartes goes on to describe this as 'transparently true'. Commenting on this passage Williams says, "This is a piece of scholastic metaphysics, and it is one of the most striking indications of the historical gap that exists between Descartes' thought and our own, despite the modern reality of much else that he writes, that he can unblinkingly accept this unintuitive and barely comprehensible principle as self-evident in the light of reason."

In his own time, it was challenged by Hobbes who in the Objections says, "Moreover, M. Descartes should consider afresh what 'more reality' means. Does reality admit of more and less? Or does he think one thing can be more of a thing than another? If so, he should consider how this can be explained to us with that degree of clarity that every demonstration calls for, and which he himself has employed elsewhere."

To this Descartes replies:

"I have ... made it quite clear how reality admits of more and less. A substance is more of a thing than a mode; if there are real qualities or incomplete substances, they are things to a greater extent than modes, but to a lesser extent than complete substances; and, finally, if there is an infinite and independent substance, it is more of a thing than a finite and dependent substance. All this is completely self-evident."

To understand Descartes' Trademark Argument it is not necessary to fully understand the underlying Aristotelian metaphysics but it is necessary to know that

- an infinite substance has the most reality and more reality than
- a finite substance, which in turn has more reality than
- a mode.

A substance is something that exists independently. The only thing that truly exists independently is an infinite substance for it does not rely on anything else for its existence. In this context 'infinite substance' means 'God'. A finite substance can exist independently other than its reliance on an infinite substance. 'Substance' does not imply 'physical substance'—for Descartes the body is one substance but the mind is also a substance.

A 'mode' is "a way or manner in which something occurs or is experienced, expressed, or done." In this scheme, a substance (e.g. a mind) will have an attribute (thought) and the mode might be willing or having an idea.

The degree of reality is related to the way in which something is dependent—"Modes are logically dependent on substance; they 'inhere in it as subject.'... Created substances are not logically, but causally, dependent on God. They do not inhere in God as subject, but are effects of God as creator."

=== Formal reality and Objective reality ===
Descartes says,

The nature of an idea is such that of itself it requires no formal reality except what it derives from my thought, of which it is a mode. But in order for a given idea to contain such and such objective reality, it must surely derive it from some cause which contains at least as much formal reality as there is objective reality in the idea.

'Formal reality' is roughly what we mean by 'actually existing.' 'Objective reality' does not mean objective as opposed to subjective but is more like the object of one's thoughts irrespective of whether or not it actually exists. Cottingham says that 'objective reality' is the 'representational content of an idea'. Hatfield says "think of an "object" of desire—a championship for your favorite sports team, say. It may not now exist, and it need never have existed. In Descartes' terminology, what has "objective reality" is something contained in the subject's mental state and so may even be called "subjective" in present-day terms."

Crucial to Descartes argument is the way in which the levels of objective reality are determined. The level of objective reality is determined by the formal reality of what is being represented or thought about. So every idea I have has the lowest level of formal reality, for every idea is a mode, but the idea of an infinite substance has more objective reality than the idea of a finite substance. Kenny notes, "we sometimes use the word 'reality' to distinguish fact from fiction: on this view, the idea of a lion would have more objective reality than the idea of a unicorn since lions exist and unicorns do not. But this is not what Descartes means." In this instance the idea of a lion and the idea of a unicorn would have the same objective reality because a lion and a unicorn (if it existed) would both be finite substances.

== Applying the causal adequacy principle ==
Using the above ideas Descartes can claim that it is obvious that there must be at least as much reality in the cause as in the effect for if there was not you would be getting something from nothing. He says "the idea of heat, or of a stone, cannot exist in me unless it is put there by some cause which contains at least as much reality as I conceive to be in the heat or in the stone. For although this cause does not transfer any of its actual or formal reality to my idea, it should not on that account be supposed that it must be less real."

Since the idea of God contains the level of (objective) reality appropriate to an infinite substance it is legitimate to ask where an idea with this level of reality came from. After considering various options Descartes concludes that it must come from a substance that has at least the same level of (formal) reality. Therefore, an infinite substance, i.e. God, must exist.

== Outline of Descartes' argument ==
- My ideas may be innate, adventitious (i.e. come from outside me), or have been invented by me. As yet I don't know their true origin.
- If ideas are considered simply as modes of thought, they are all equal and appear to come from within me; in so far as different ideas represent different things they differ widely. Ideas which represent substances contain within themselves more objective reality than the ideas which merely represent modes; the idea that gives me my understanding of a supreme God, (eternal, infinite, etc.) has more objective reality than the ideas that represent finite substances.
- It is manifest by the natural light that there must be at least as much reality in the efficient and total cause as in the effect of that cause.
- It follows from this both that something cannot arise from nothing, and also that what contains more reality cannot arise from what contains less reality. And this applies not only when considering formal reality, but also when considering objective reality.
- Although the reality in my ideas is merely objective reality what ultimately causes those ideas must contain the same formal reality. Although one idea may originate from another, there cannot be an infinite regress here; eventually one must reach a primary idea, the cause of which will contain formally all the reality which is present only objectively in the idea.
- Ideas are like pictures which can easily fall short of the perfection of the things from which they are taken, but which cannot contain anything greater or more perfect.
- If the objective reality of any of my ideas turns out to be so great that I am sure the same reality does not reside in me, either formally or eminently (i.e. potentially), and hence that I myself cannot be its cause, it will necessarily follow that I am not alone in the world, but that some other thing which is the cause of this idea also exists.
- In addition to being aware of myself, I have other ideas—of God, corporeal and inanimate things, angels, animals and other men like myself. Except for the idea of God, it doesn't seem impossible that these ideas originated from within myself.
- By the word 'God' I understand a substance that is infinite, eternal, immutable, etc. These attributes are such that it doesn't seem possible for them to have originated from me alone. So from what has been said it must be concluded that God necessarily exists.

Further considerations:

- Although I have the idea of substance in me by virtue of being a substance, this does not account for my having the idea of an infinite substance, when I am finite. This idea must have come from some substance which really was infinite.
- I cannot have gained the idea of the infinite merely by negating the finite. On the contrary, to know that I am finite means knowing that I lack something and so must first have the idea of the infinite to make that comparison.
- The perfections which I attribute to God do not exist in me potentially. It is true that I have many potentialities which are not yet actual but this irrelevant to the idea of God, which contains absolutely nothing that is potential. It might be thought that my gradual increase in knowledge could continue to infinity but firstly, this gradual increase in knowledge is itself a sign of imperfection and, secondly, God I take to be actually infinite, so that nothing can be added to his perfection whereas increasing knowledge will never reach the point where it is not capable of a further increase. Finally, the objective being of an idea cannot be produced merely by potential being, which strictly speaking is nothing, but only by actual or formal being.

Additional argument for the existence of God:

- I couldn't exist as the kind of thing that has this idea of God if God didn't exist, for I didn't create myself, I haven't always existed, and, although there may be a series of causes that led to my existence, the ultimate cause must be such that it could give me the idea of God and this, for the reasons already given, will be God.
- This idea of God didn't come to me via the senses, nor did I invent this idea for I am plainly unable either to take away anything from it or to add anything to it. The only remaining alternative is that it is innate in me.

== Criticisms of the trademark argument ==
Cunning notes that "Commentators have argued that there is not much hope for the argument from objective reality." Wilson says that she will say little about Descartes arguments for the existence of God for "while these arguments are interesting enough, I don’t think Descartes is in a position to defend their soundness very forcefully." Williams comments that "Descartes took these hopeless arguments for the existence of God to be self-evidently valid, conditioned in this by historical and perhaps also by temperamental factors."

Hobbes' complaint that Descartes has not offered an adequate account of degrees of reality does not seem to have been answered and Descartes' response that it is 'self-evident' surely is not enough. There may be some superficial appeal in the claim that an actual flower has more reality than an idea of a flower but this needs to be unpacked. 'Reality' cannot be equated with 'existence' for, apart from the fact that 'degrees of existence' is hardly less problematic than 'degrees of reality', as Wilson comments, "reality must not be confused with existence: otherwise the existence of God would be overtly assumed in the premises of the argument."

Even if the argument is judged on its own terms and we grant that there can be degrees of formal reality and degrees of objective reality there are still significant problems. Crucial to the argument as it is normally reconstructed is that the degree of objective reality is determined by the degree of formal reality that the thing being thought about would have if it existed. Descartes offers no reason why this should be so. Wilson says, "Descartes has simply made an arbitrary stipulation here." There seems to be no good reason why we could not maintain different degrees of objective reality but insist that the idea of an infinite substance still has less reality than the amount of reality conferred by the formal reality of a finite substance.

Descartes may be inconsistent on this point for in the Replies he says of objective existence, "this mode of being is of course much less perfect than that possessed by things which exist outside the intellect; but, as I did explain, it is not therefore simply nothing." Despite what Descartes appears to say in the Meditations it may be necessary for the objective reality to be less than the formal reality of the thing represented. Williams points out, "God, as the argument insists, has more reality or perfection than anything else whatever. Hence if Descartes' idea of God is not itself God (which would of course be absurd), it cannot, however regarded, possess as much reality as God, and hence cannot demand as much reality in its cause as God possesses. So the argument seems to fall short of positing God as cause of the idea." He goes on to say that Descartes must, therefore be relying on something more than the general principle that there must be as much formal reality in the cause of an idea as there is objective reality in the idea itself. Instead, he suggests, Descartes is relying on special features of the idea of God: "the infinity and perfection of God, represented in his idea, are of such a special character, so far in excess of any other possible cause, that the only thing adequate to produce an idea of that would be the thing itself, God."

Then there is the problem of how it can be possible for a finite mind to have a clear and distinct idea of an infinite God. Descartes was challenged on this and in the first set of Replies says, "the infinite, qua infinite, can in no way be grasped. But it can still be understood, in so far as we can clearly and distinctly understand that something is such that no limitations can be found in it, and this amounts to understanding clearly that it is infinite." Cottingham argues that making this distinction is "an unsatisfactory line of defence". He refers to Descartes own analogy of a man who had an idea of a very complex machine from which it could be inferred that he had either seen the machine, been told about the machine or was clever enough to invent it. He adds, "But clearly such inferences will hold only if the man has a quite determinate idea of the machine. If a man comes up and says that he has an idea of a marvellous machine which will feed the hungry by making proteins out of sand, I shall be impressed neither by his experience nor by his powers of invention if it turns out that that is all there is to the idea, and he has no conception, or only the haziest conception, of how such a machine might work."

Finally, it might be added, for this proof to do the work Descartes is asking of it the proof needs to be clear and distinct. Given the above considerations this is unconvincing. In the second set of replies Descartes says this is the fault of the reader:

I do not see what I can add to make it any clearer that the idea in question could not be present to my mind unless a supreme being existed. I can only say that it depends on the reader: if he attends carefully to what I have written he should be able to free himself from the preconceived opinions which may be eclipsing his natural light, and to accustom himself to believing in the primary notions, which are as evident and true as anything can be, in preference to opinions which are obscure and false, albeit fixed in the mind by long habit... I cannot force this truth on my readers if they are lazy, since it depends solely on their exercising their own powers of thought.

== See also ==
- Cartesian Circle

== Sources ==
- René Descartes, Meditations and Other Metaphysical Writings
- Christopher Hamilton (2003), Understanding Philosophy
