= Cartesian circle =

Error in reasoning attributed to René Descartes

The Cartesian circle (also known as Arnauld's circle) is an example of fallacious circular reasoning attributed to French philosopher René Descartes. He argued that the existence of God is proven by reliable perception, which is itself guaranteed by God.

== The argument ==
Descartes argues – for example, in the third of his Meditations on First Philosophy – that whatever one clearly and distinctly perceives is true: "I now seem to be able to lay it down as a general rule that whatever I perceive very clearly and distinctly is true" (AT VII 35). He goes on in the same Meditation to argue for the existence of a benevolent God, in order to defeat his skeptical argument in the first Meditation that God might be a deceiver. He then says that without his knowledge of God's existence, none of his knowledge could be certain.

The Cartesian circle is a criticism of the above that takes this form:

1. Descartes' proof of the reliability of clear and distinct perceptions takes as a premise God's existence as a non-deceiver.
2. Descartes' proofs of God's existence presuppose the reliability of clear and distinct perceptions.

Many commentators, both at the time that Descartes wrote and since, have argued that this involves a circular argument, as he relies upon the principle of clarity and distinctness to argue for the existence of God, and then claims that God is the guarantor of his clear and distinct ideas.

== Descartes' contemporaries ==
The first person to raise this criticism was Marin Mersenne, in the "Second Set of Objections" to the Meditations:

You are not yet certain of the existence of God, and you say that you are not certain of anything. It follows from this that you do not yet clearly and distinctly know that you are a thinking thing, since, on your own admission, that knowledge depends on the clear knowledge of an existing God; and this you have not proved in the passage where you draw the conclusion that you clearly know what you are. (AT VII 124–125)

Antoine Arnauld was another one of Descartes' objectors, likewise arguing that God's existence cannot be used to prove that what one clearly and distinctly perceives is true.

Descartes' own response to this criticism, in his "Author's Replies to the Fourth Set of Objections", is first to give what has become known as the Memory response; he points out that in the fifth Meditation (at AT VII 69–70) he did not say that he needed God to guarantee the truth of his clear and distinct ideas, only to guarantee his memory:

When I said that we can know nothing for certain until we are aware that God exists, I expressly declared that I was speaking only of knowledge of those conclusions which can be recalled when we are no longer attending to the arguments by means of which we deduced them. (AT VII 140)

Secondly, he explicitly denies that the cogito is an inference: "When someone says 'I am thinking, therefore I am, or I exist' he does not deduce existence from thought by means of a syllogism, but recognizes it as something self-evident by a simple intuition of the mind" (AT VII 140). Finally, he points out that the certainty of clear and distinct ideas does not depend upon God's guarantee (AT VII 145–146). The cogito in particular is self-verifying, indubitable, immune to the strongest doubt.

== Modern commentators ==
Bernard Williams presents the memory defense as follows: "When one is actually intuiting a given proposition, no doubt can be entertained. So any doubt there can be must be entertained when one is not intuiting the proposition." He goes on to argue: "The trouble with Descartes's system is not that it is circular; nor that there is an illegitimate relation between the proofs of God and the clear and distinct perceptions [...] The trouble is that the proofs of God are invalid and do not convince even when they are supposedly being intuited."

As Andrea Christofidou explains:

The distinction appropriate here is that between cognitio and scientia; both are true and cannot be contradicted, but the latter is objectively true and certain (with the guarantee of God), while the former is subjectively true and certain, that is, time-bound, and objectively possible (and does not need the guarantee of God).

Another defense of Descartes against the charge of circularity is developed by Harry Frankfurt in his book Demons, Dreamers, and Madmen. Frankfurt suggests that Descartes's arguments for the existence of God, and for the reliability of reason, are not intended to prove that their conclusions are true, but to show that reason leads to them. Thus, reason is validated by being shown to confirm its own validity instead of leading to a denial of its validity by being shown to be incapable of demonstrating the existence of a benevolent God.

== See also ==
- Circular reasoning
- Ontological argument
