= Orange College of Breda =

Collegium Auriacum
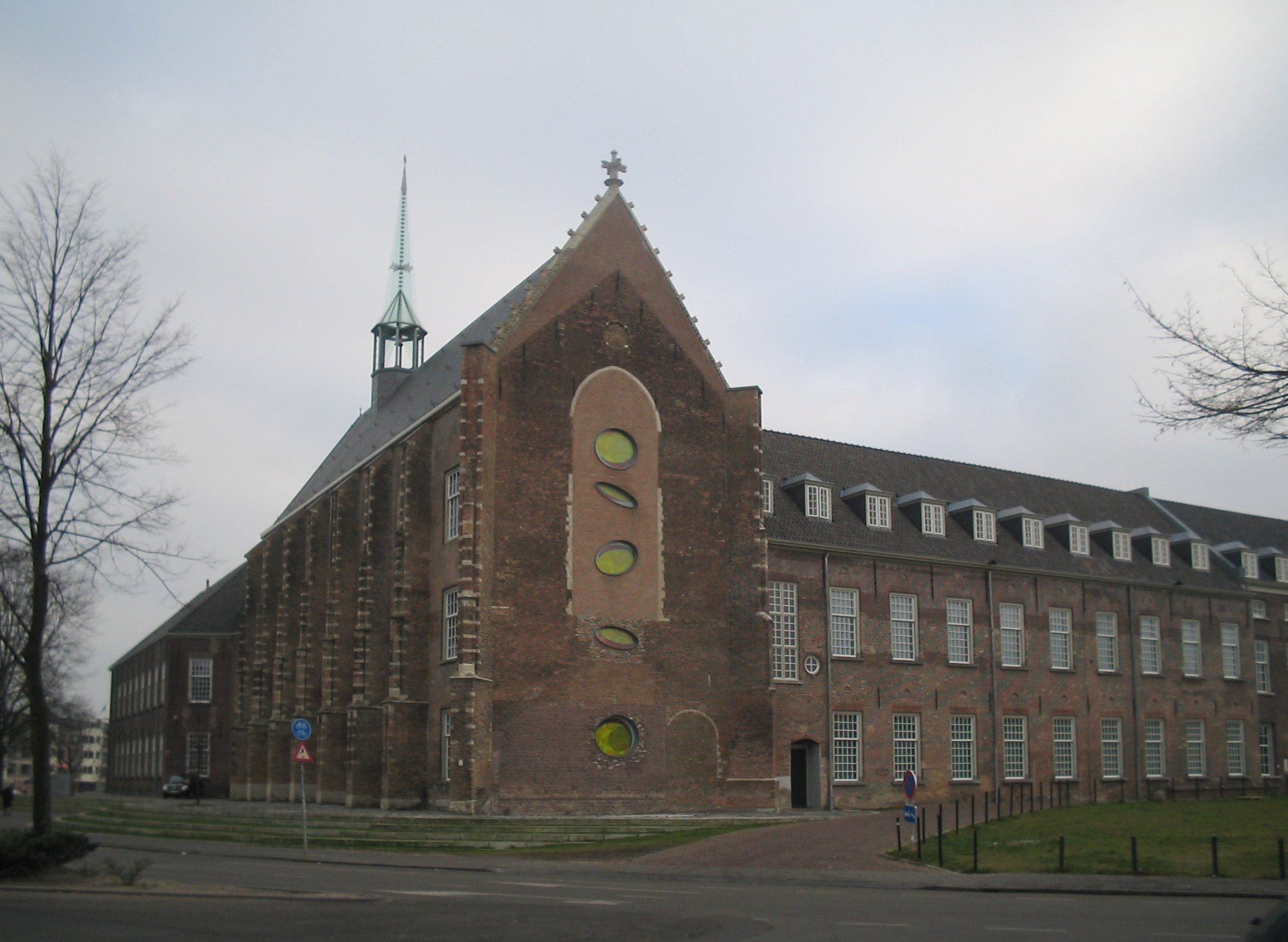
- The Kloosterkazerne, home of the college
- Type: Princely
- Active: 16 September 1646–1669
- Administrative staff: Rector, Professors of Divinity, Philosophy, Mathematics, and Law
- Location: (Dutch Republic) Breda, United Netherlands

The Orange College of Breda (Latin: Collegium Auriacum) was a college of higher learning at Breda in the Dutch Republic in the middle of the 17th century, teaching divinity, philosophy, mathematics, and law.

In English it was sometimes called the Aurangian College, in Dutch College van Oranje, Oranjecollege, or Illustre School te Breda, and in French Collège d'Orange à Bréda.

== History ==
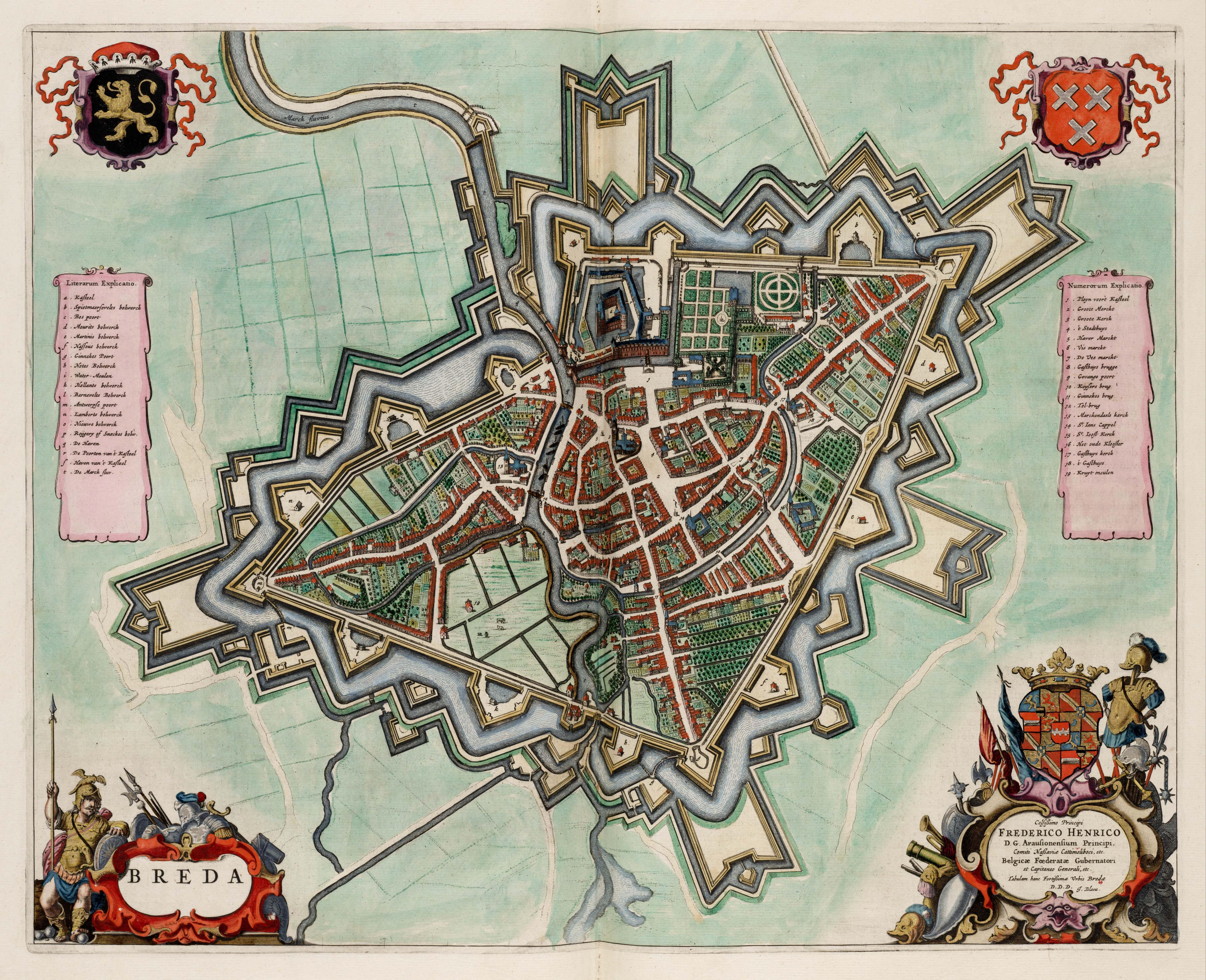
Joan Blaeu's map of Breda in 1649, from the Atlas van Loon

Breda was the seat in the Netherlands of the House of Orange-Nassau, although the city was several times lost to the Spanish. At the Siege of Breda of 1637 the city was finally recaptured by Frederick Henry, Prince of Orange, and in 1646 he founded the college, modelling it on Saumur, Geneva, and Oxford, to train young men of good family for the army and the civil service. As its home he provided the Kloosterkazerne, previously a nunnery. Jan van Vliet travelled to Breda, taking his whole family with him, to be present at the inauguration of the college on 16 September 1646. André Rivet, the learned French Huguenot tutor of the future William II of Orange, was the first Rector of the college.

At the time the college was founded, Breda was a town of only about 4,000 inhabitants, not counting the soldiers. Six months after its establishment, the college had fewer than sixty students, and its level and status were still unclear. In the event, it proved to be "a general training-centre for young men of quality, many of whom were to be officers or already held that rank in the Prince's army". However, a high proportion of those taught were French Huguenots and English expatriates.

Christiaan Huygens was admitted in March 1647 to study law, transferring from Leiden, and proved to be the most brilliant of Breda's students. His younger brother Lodewijck Huygens was at the college from 1649 to 1651, when he got into trouble over fighting a duel. Almost immediately he was sent on a diplomatic mission to England. The brothers' father, Constantijn Huygens, was one of the "curators" (or trustees) of the college.

The Englishman John Pell was professor of mathematics at the college from 1646, having been lured away from Amsterdam by Frederick Henry's offer of a salary of one thousand guilders a year. He returned to England shortly before the First Anglo-Dutch War broke out in 1652. Lodewijck Gerarduszoon van Renesse (1599–1671) was professor of divinity, and Franc Plant taught Hebrew.

The number of students increased after 1649, when the future Charles II of England, in exile thanks to the English Civil War, settled at Breda, and the town became a haven for many of the English royalists and their families who had also been forced to flee. In August 1653, Charles's secretary Sir Edward Nicholas asked Mary, Princess Royal and Princess of Orange, to use her influence to get his friend Peter Mews a post at the college as reader in philosophy, but he had a reply from Hyde that the place called for a man "that hath not bene a truant from his bookes".

By the Declaration of Breda of April 1660, Charles II offered terms for a settlement which would restore him to the thrones of England, Ireland, and Scotland. On 8 May he was proclaimed king at Westminster and returned home, taking with him most of the exiles. This was one of the factors which led to the college closing in 1669, as by then it had too few students.

After the Restoration Pell maintained a friendship with his former student at Breda William Brereton, and after Brereton died in 1680 John Aubrey wrote "Never was there greater love between Master and Scholar then between Dr. Pell and this Scholar of his, whose death hath deprived this worthy Doctor of an ingeniose Companion and a usefull Friend."

== Notable students ==
- Christiaan Huygens (1647–1649)
- Lodewijck Huygens (1649–1651)
- William Brereton, 3rd Baron Brereton
- Philip Stanhope, 2nd Earl of Chesterfield

== Gallery ==
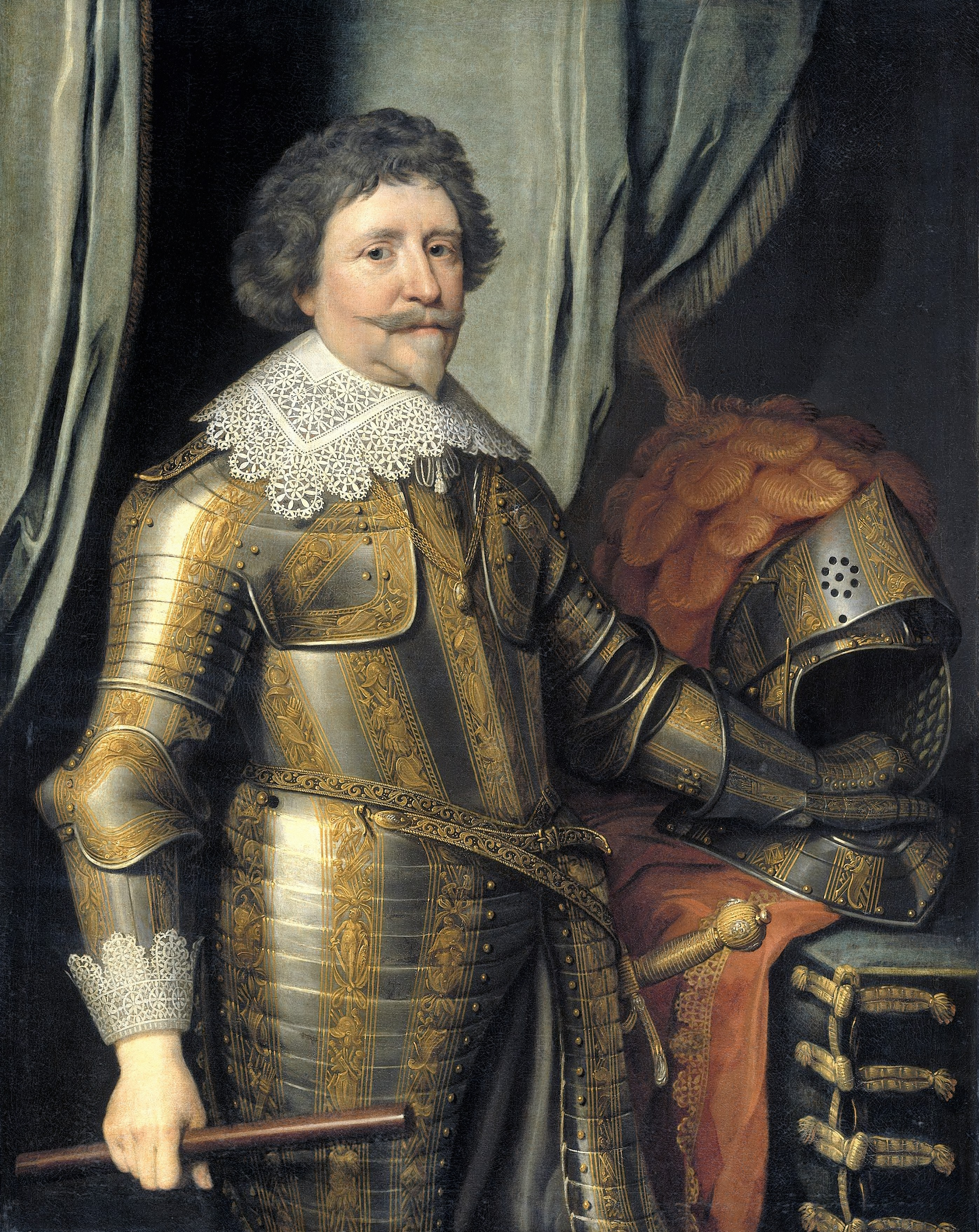
Frederick Henry, Prince of Orange, Founder

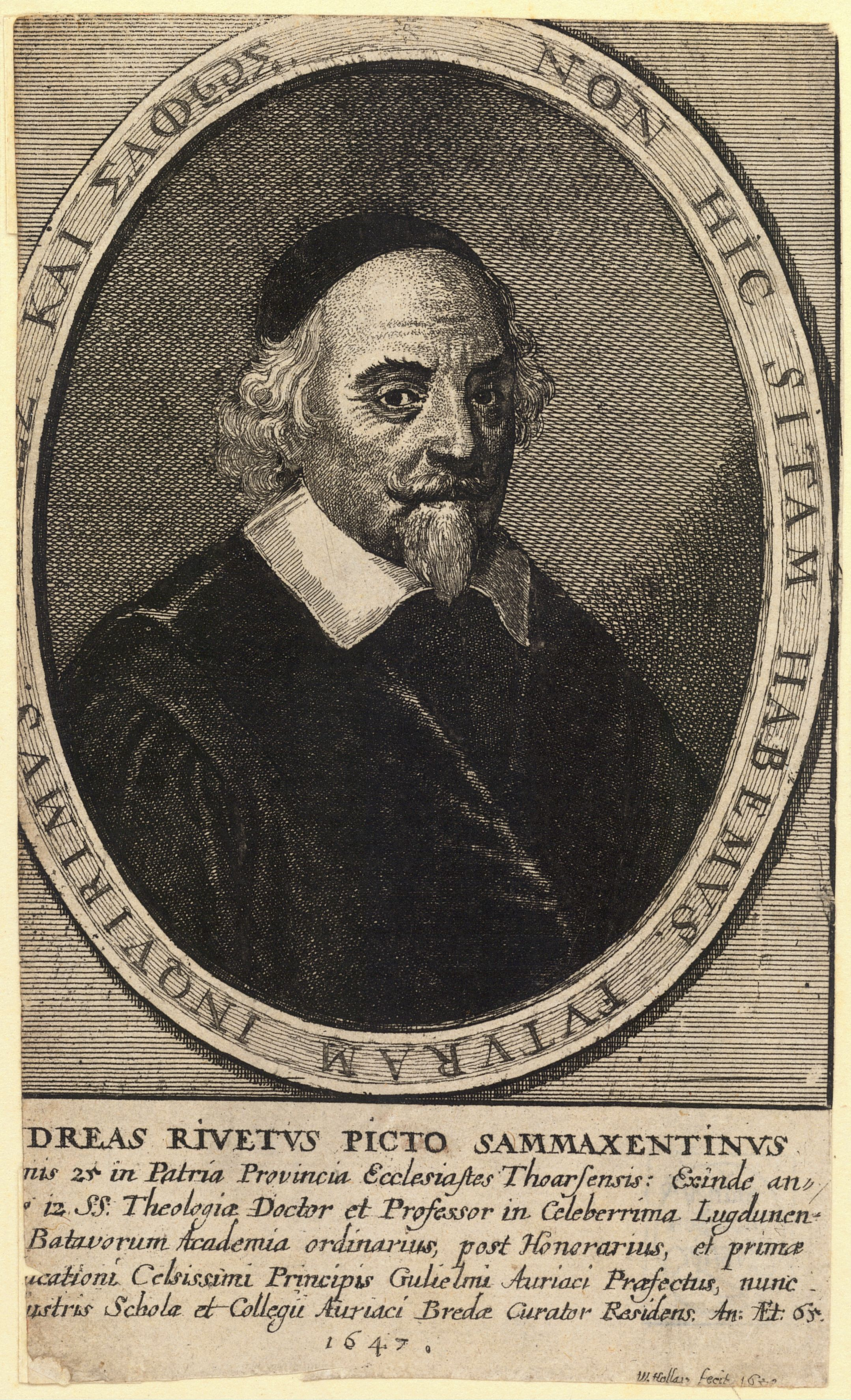
André Rivet, first Rector, by Hollar, 1647, describing him in Latin as "now Curator of the Orange School and College of Breda"

Christiaan Huygens
