= Suzanna van Baerle =

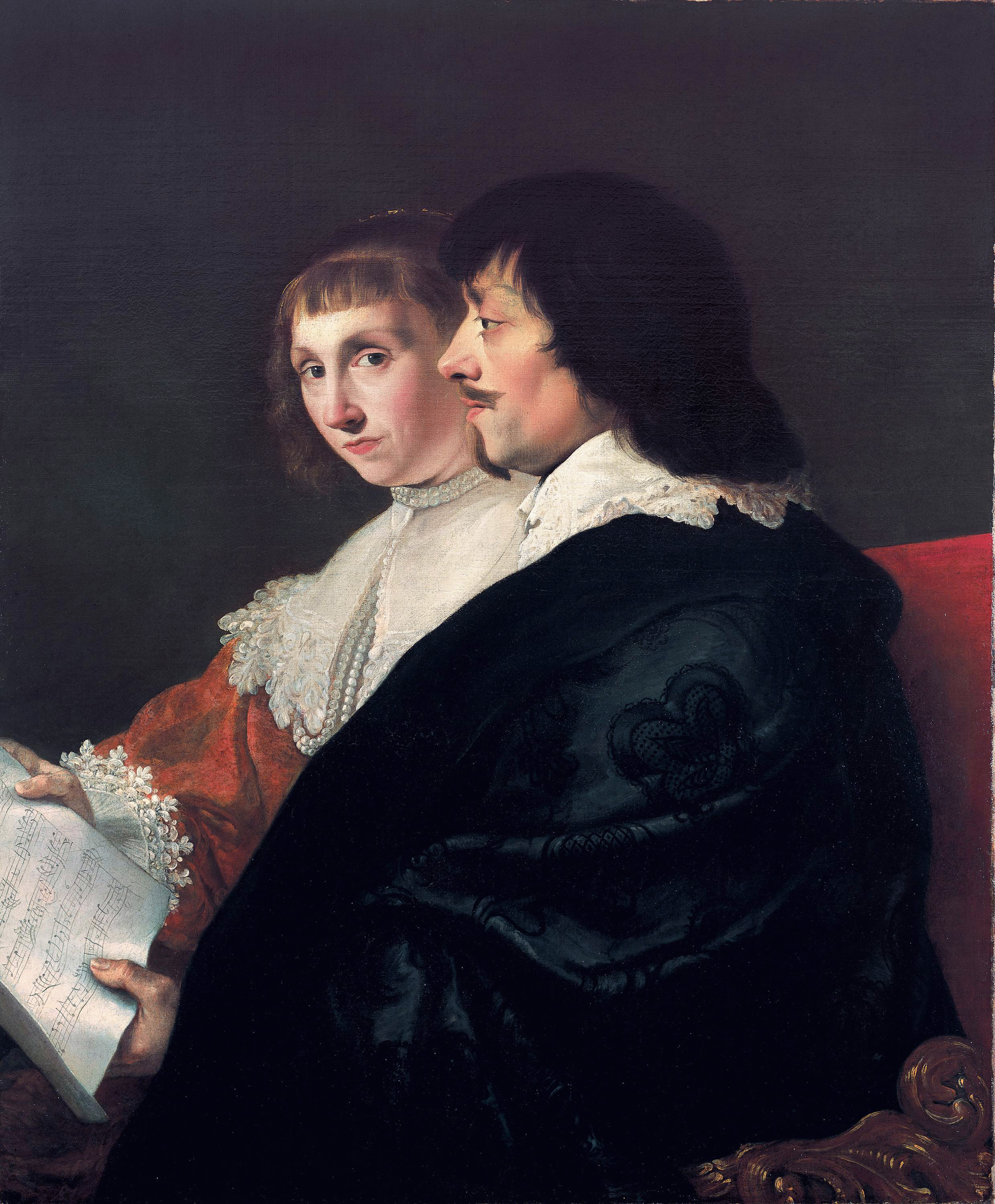
- Double portrait of Suzanna and Constantijn Huygens, by Jacob van Campen
- Born: 8 March 1599; Amsterdam
- Died: 10 May 1637 (aged 38); The Hague
- Spouse: Constantijn Huygens
- Children: 5, including Constantijn, Christiaan, and Lodewijk

Suzanna van Baerle or Susanna Huygens (8 March 1599 – 10 May 1637) was a Dutch woman known for the book-long poem Dagh-werck that was written as a close collaboration with her husband, Constantijn Huygens.

== Intellectual pursuits ==
While Constantijn Huygens is often credited as the sole author of Dagh-werck, there is some evidence to suggest Van Baerle played a role in its creation. Handwriting in one of the preserved manuscripts of Dagh-werck it appears Van Baerle wrote or transcribed a substantial portion of the work. Huygens seems to have valued Van Baerle's intellectual abilities, once referring to their marriage as "two minds joined in a single mind" appearing to regard her as his intellectual equal. Huygens was not the only prominent scholar to recognize Van Baerle's intellectual prowess. After Descartes received Constantijn Huygens' comments on a draft of his La Dioptrique he wrote back "if Madame de Zulichem [sic] would like also to add her own corrections, I would consider that an inestimable favor on her part. I would value her judgement, which is naturally excellent, far higher than that of many of the Philosophers, whose judgement art [formal training] has rendered extremely defective."

== Family life ==
Van Baerle was born in Amsterdam as the daughter of the wealthy merchant Jan van Baerle (d.1605) and Jacomina Hoon (d.1617) whose early deaths left her a wealthy heiress at a young age. She had many suitors, but she chose to marry Constantijn Huygens who fell in love with her in 1626. Among her other suiters was Constantijn Huygens' brother Maurits for whom the Huygens family had originally attempted to win Van Baerle's hand in marriage. Van Baerle and Huygens married on April 6, 1627, and had five children, Constantijn Huygens, Jr., Christiaan Huygens, Lodewijk Huygens, Philips Huygens (1633–1657) and Suzanna Huygens (1637–1725). Susanna died on May 10, 1637, shortly after the birth of her youngest child from an unknown illness, possibly the result of complications related to the birth. Constantijn Huygens lived for almost another 50 years, but did not remarry.
