= Lodewijck Huygens =

Dutch diplomat

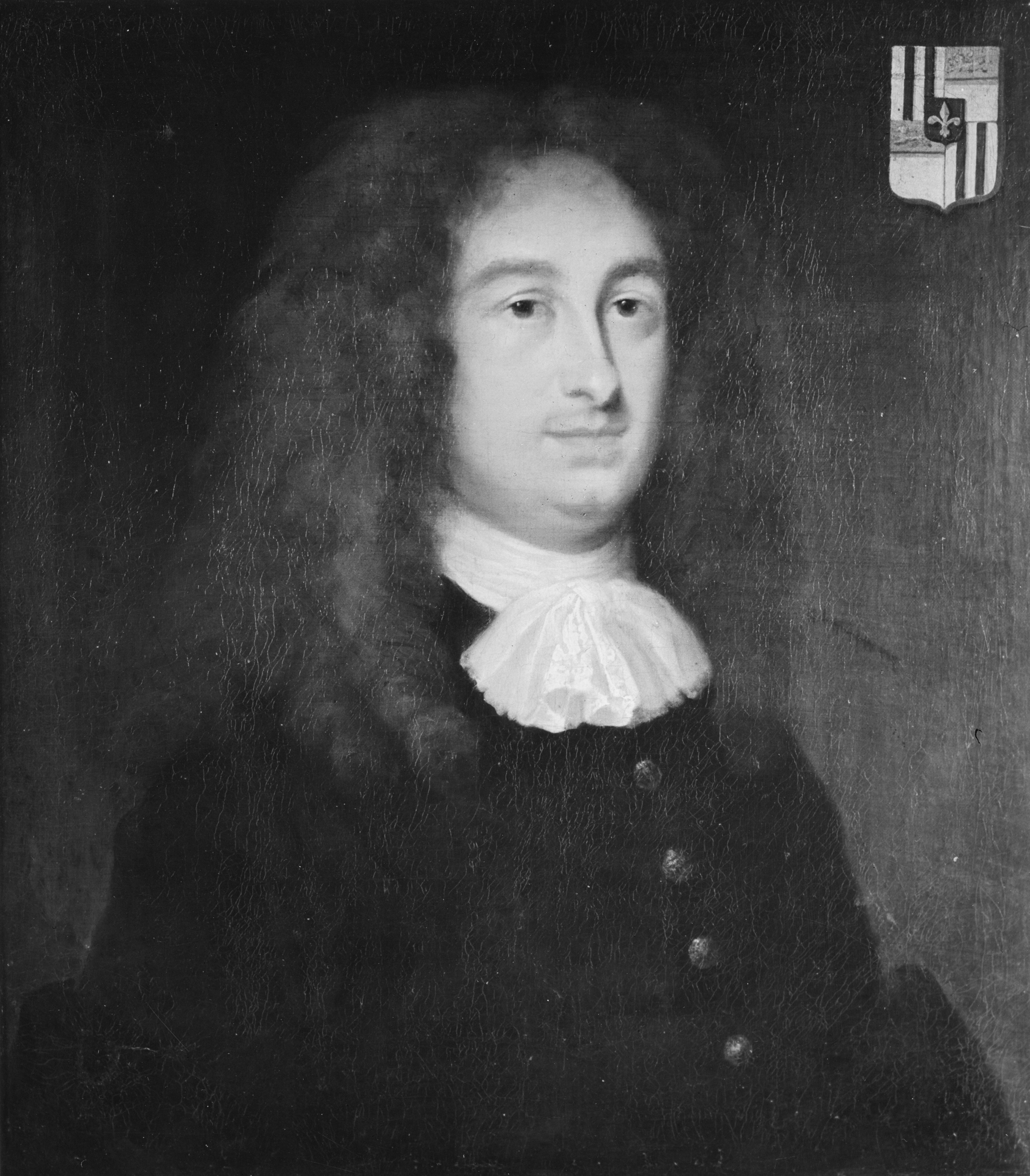
Lodewijck Huygens (anonymous portrait), 1674

Lodewijck Huygens (13 March 1631 – 1 July 1699) was a Dutch diplomat.

== Life ==
Huyghens was the third son of the diplomat Constantijn Huygens and Suzanna van Baerle. His two older brothers were Constantijn Huygens, Jr. and the scientist Christiaan Huygens. He was admitted to the Orange College of Breda in 1649, but in 1651 got into trouble for fighting a duel. Soon after this he was sent on a diplomatic mission to England.

Starting in 1669, Huygens and his brother Christiaan did some of the earliest work on life expectancy based on death statistics in London published by John Graunt.

In 1672 the newly appointed Stadtholder William III of Orange, later King William III of England and Ireland and William II of Scotland, appointed Huygens as sheriff of Gorinchem. His actions as sheriff eventually resulted in considerable strife between local factions, whereby Huygens was faced with a formidable opponent, Jacob van der Ulft.

Accusations of corruption against Huygens eventually resulted in a criminal case before the Provincial Court of Holland and Zeeland, yet in 1678 Huygens was allowed to return to his office of sheriff of Gorinchem. Strife and conflict in the city of Gorinchem continued after His return, which ultimately resulted in his fall from grace, with his patron William III giving him less support after 1685. Huygens was persuaded to give up his office as sheriff of Gorinchem and was appointed a member of the Admiralty of the Meuse instead.

== Personal life ==
On 5 May 1674, when he was aged 43, Huyghens married Jacoba Teding van Berkhout (1645–1711), a daughter of Paulus Teding van Berkhout and Jacomina van der Vorst. They had eight children, but only the first three sons survived infancy: Constantijn, born 10 March 1675 at Gorinchem, Gorkum, Louis Diederik, born 2 May 1676 at the Hague, Delft, and Paulus, born 24 August 1677 at Gorinchem. Their other five children all died within a few days of birth, apart from Maurits, born about 1686, who died before he was one year old. Susanna Christina was born and died circa 1679, Christiaan Hendrik was born 19 April 1680 at Gorinchem and died a few days later, Christiaan Philips, born 29 July 1681 at Gorinchem, died a few hours after, as did Adriaan, born 18 August 1682.

== Bibliography ==
- Edward Chaney, The Grand Tour and the Great Rebellion (Slatkine, Geneva and C.I.R.V.I. Moncalieri, 1985).
- Herbert H. Rowen, American historian, (1916–1999), John de Witt, Statesman of the True Freedom (Cambridge University Press, 1986, New edition (2002)). 236 pages. ISBN 0-521-52708-2.
- Herbert H. Rowen John de Witt, Grand Pensionary of Holland, 1625–1672. Princeton University Press. (1978), 950 pages. ISBN 0-691-05247-6. Bibliography: pages 895 – 928.
- Quentin Skinner, born November 1940, is now the Barber Beaumont Professor of the Humanities at Queen Mary, University of London. In his Visions of politics : Vol III, Hobbes and Civil Science, Pp. xvii + 386. New York: Cambridge University Press, (2002), he mentions Lodewijck Huygens as being influenced by Thomas Hobbes, (1588–1679).
- H.F. de Wit, Gorcums Heren. Regentenpolitiek 1650–1750 (Gorinchem 1981, 20–31)

A.G.H. Bachrach and R.G. Collmer, Lodewijck Huygens The English Journal 1651-1652 (Leiden: E.J. Brill/Leiden University Press (1982)

== See also ==
- Constantijn Huygens, Jr. – brother
