= Zuilichem =

- Village
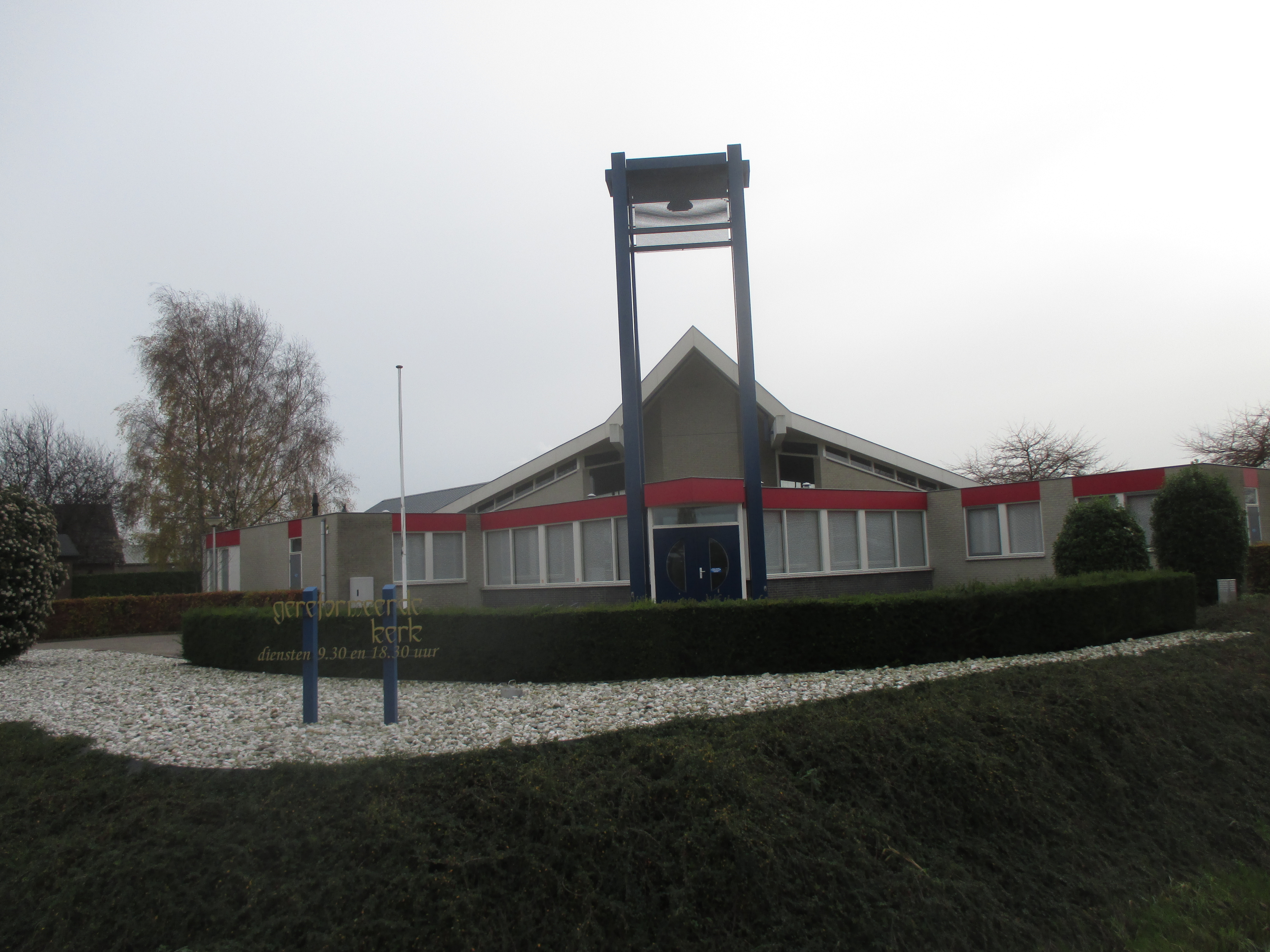
- Restored Reformed Church in Zuilichem

- Coat of arms

- Location in the Netherlands Zuilichem (Netherlands)
- Coordinates: 51.8080°N 5.1358°E
- Country: Netherlands
- Province: Gelderland
- Municipality: Zaltbommel

Area
  - Total: 4.47 km^{2} (1.73 sq mi)
- Elevation: 3 m (9.8 ft)

Population
  - Total: 1,685
  - Density: 377/km^{2} (976/sq mi)
- Time zone: UTC+1 (CET)
  - Summer (DST): UTC+2 (CEST)
- Postal code: 5305
- Dialing code: 0418

Zuilichem is a village in the Dutch province of Gelderland. It is a part of the municipality of Zaltbommel, and lies about 11 km east of Gorinchem. Zuilichem was a separate municipality until 1955, when it was merged with Brakel.

The seventeenth-century Dutch diplomat and polymath Constantijn Huygens purchased the manor and title of Zuilichem in 1630, which passed over to his first son Constantijn Huygens after his death.

== History ==
It was first mentioned in 1143 as Solekeim, and means "settlement of the people of Sulo (person)". The village developed along the Waal as a stretched out esdorp. The Dutch Reformed Church was rebuilt in 1866 after a fire. It suffered severe damage in 1945 and a new tower was built in 1950. In 1840, Zuilichem was home to 686 people. The village suffered severe damage during the flood of 1861. In 2004, 244 of the 872 of the members of the Reformed Church did not want to join the united Protestant Church, and became members of the Restored Reformed Church. In 2010, they opened their own church building.

== Windmills ==
There are two windmills near Zuilichem. The polder mill is a pumping mill from 1720. It was one of 17 windmills and the only one who has remained. In 1855, a steam powered pumping station was built, however the wind mill remained in operation as a backup and served until 1950, because it was no longer needed. The grist mill De Hoop was built in 1863, and is usually in operation on Saturdays.

== Gallery ==
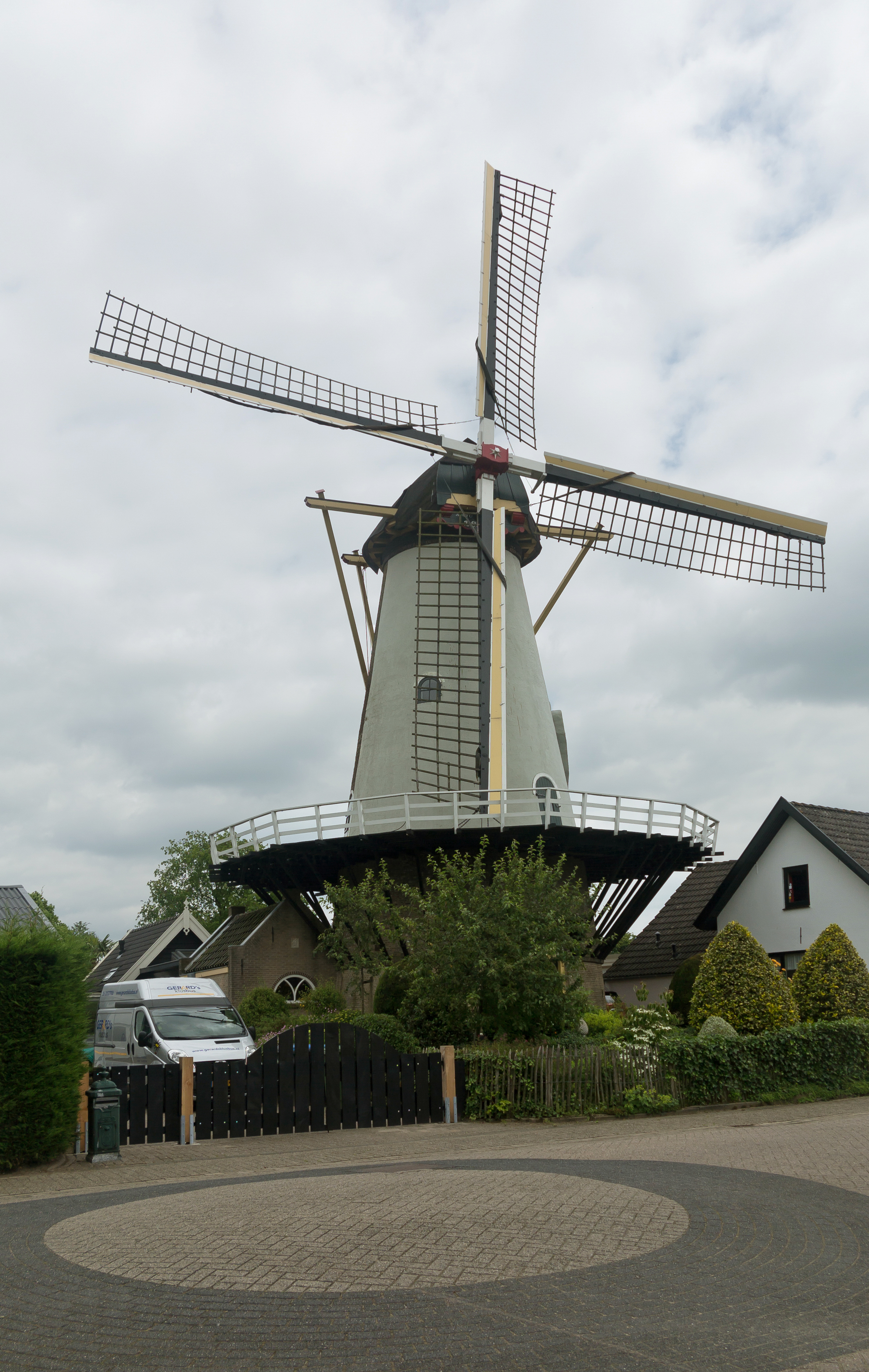
Zuilichem, windmill: molen de Hoop

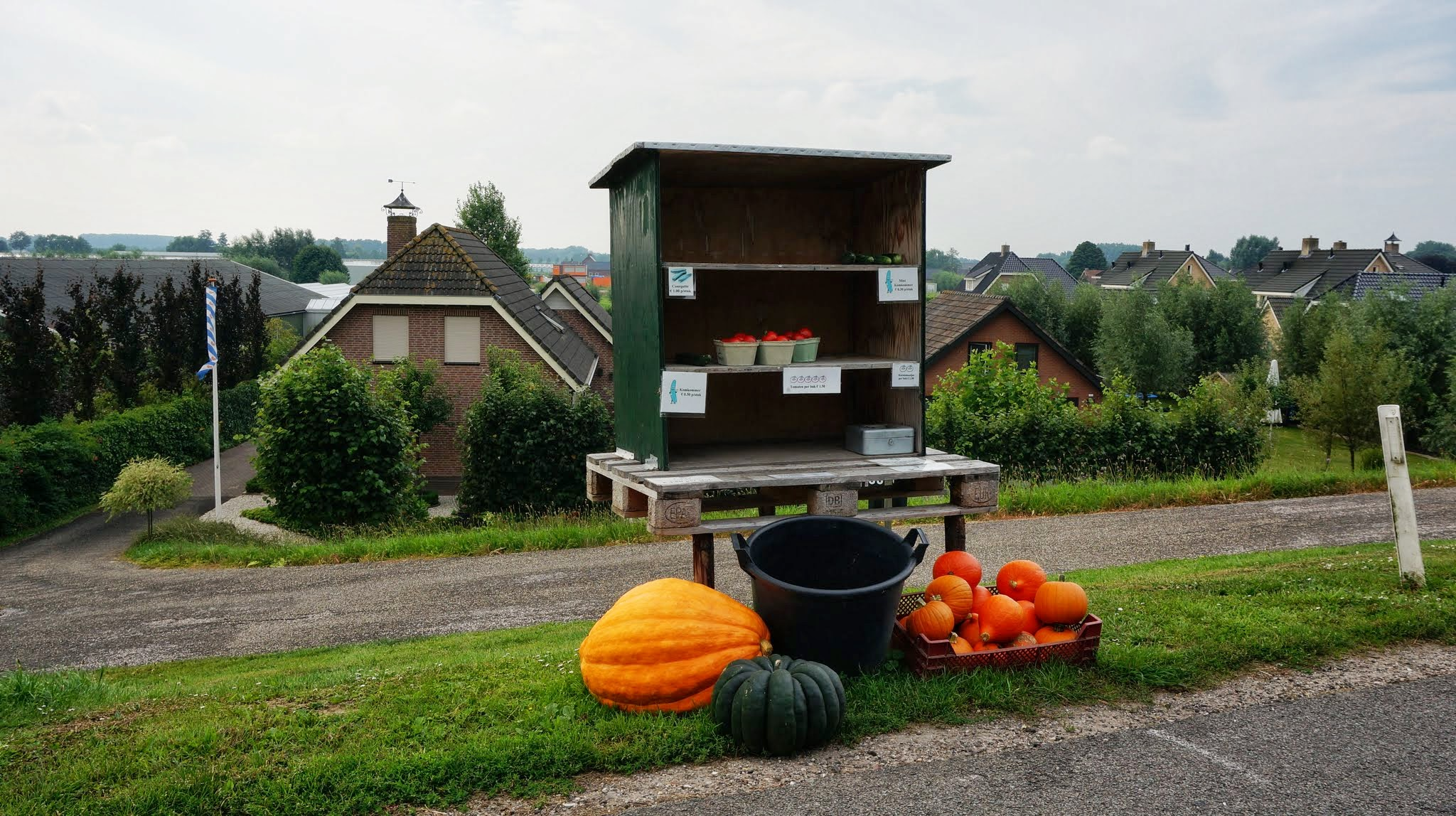
Fruit and pumpkins

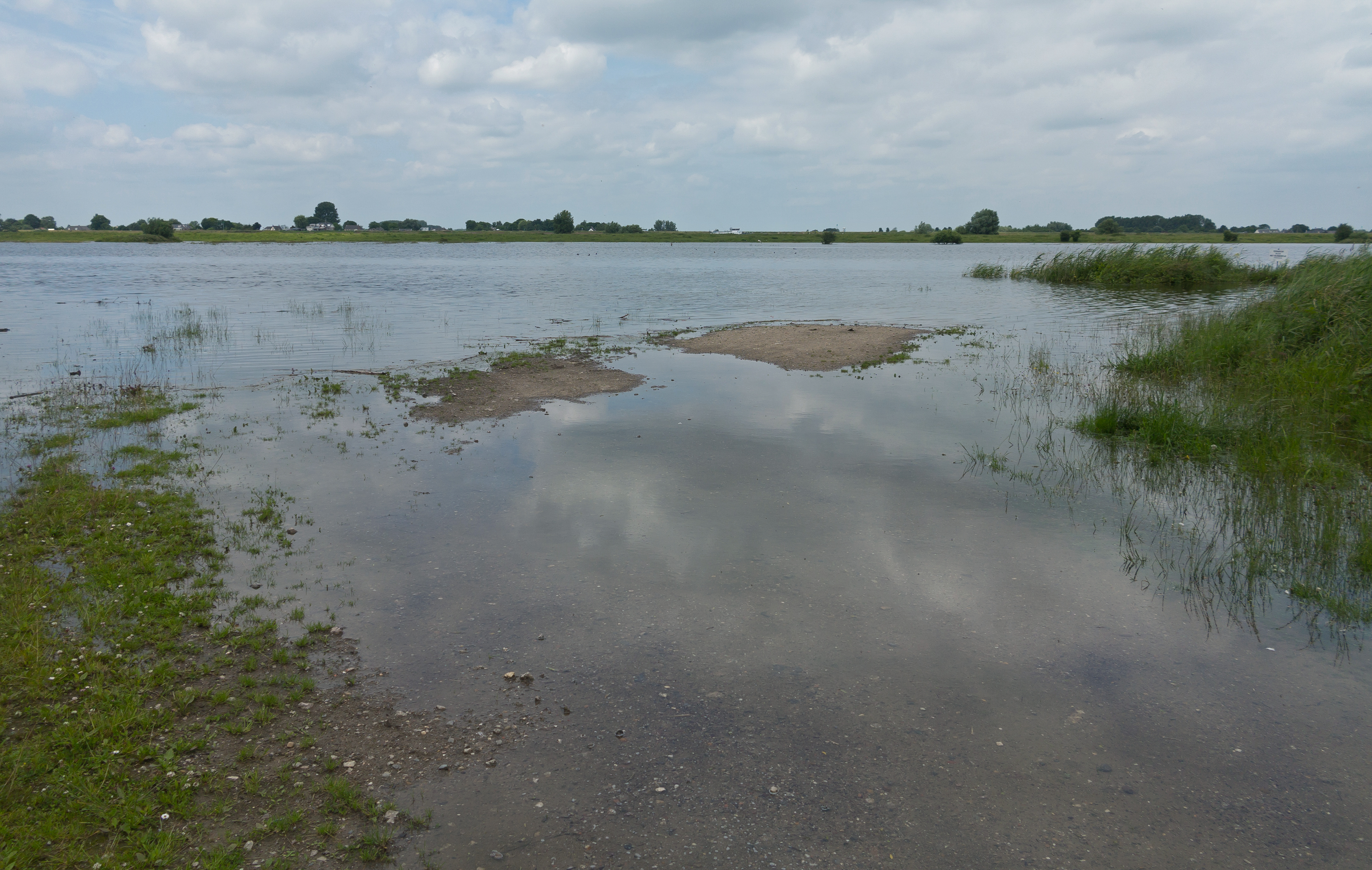
De Waal River

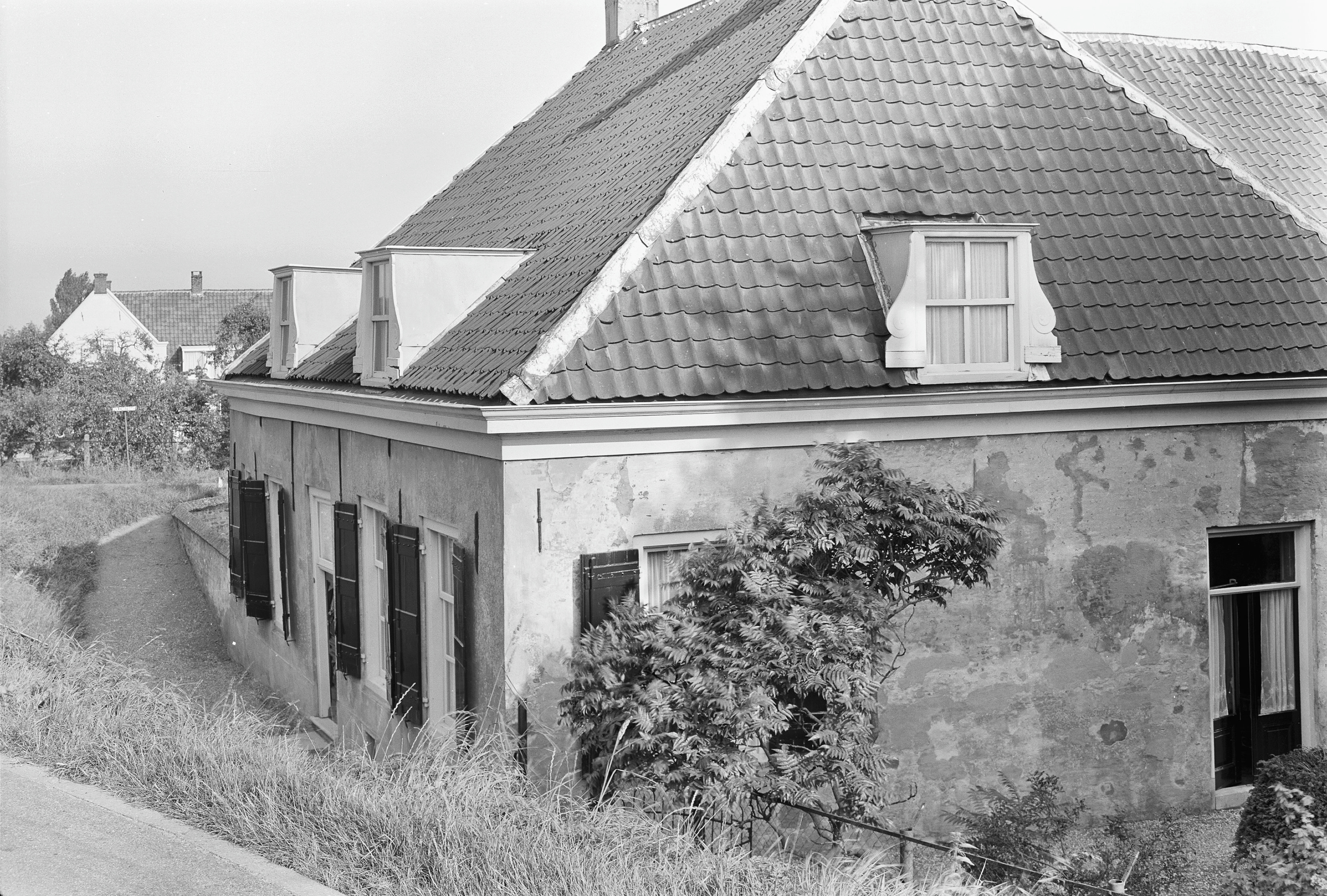
House in Zuilichem
