= André Rivet =

French Huguenot theologian

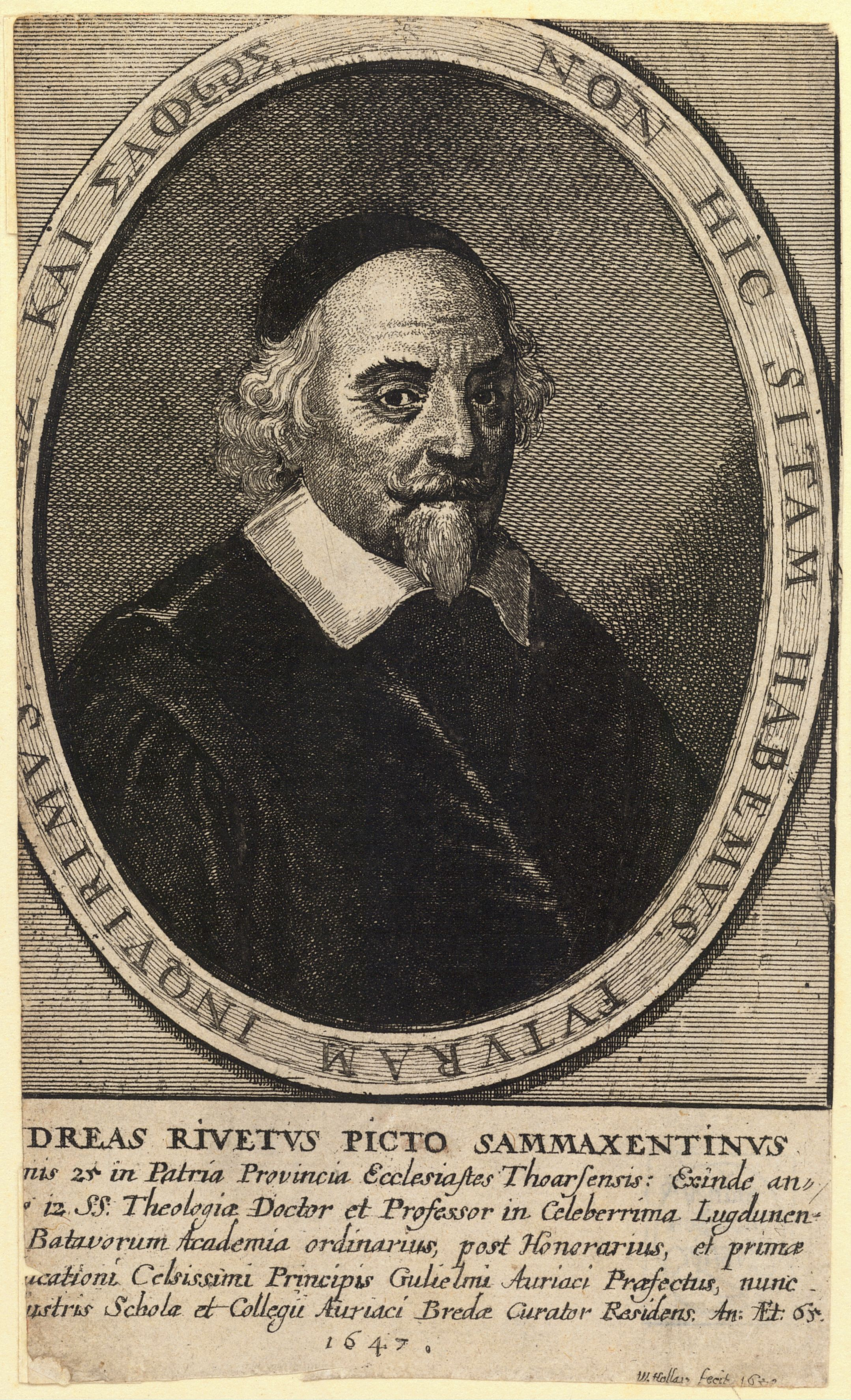
A 1647 engraving of André Rivet by Wenceslas Hollar

André Rivet (Andreas Rivetus) (August 1572 – 7 January 1651) was a French Huguenot theologian.

== Life ==
Rivet was born at Saint-Maixent, 43 km (27 mi) southwest of Poitiers, France. After completing his education at Bern, he studied theology privately at Bern and La Rochelle, and from 1595 to 1620 was at Thouars, first as chaplain of the duke of La Trémouille and later as pastor. In 1617 he was elected president of the Synod at Vitré; and in 1620 he was called to Leiden as professor of theology.

In 1632 Stadholder Frederick Henry appointed Rivet tutor of his son, later William II, while the university made him honorary professor. In 1641 he attended the prince on his visit to England. In 1645 he exchanged letters with the Irish writer Dorothy Durie concerning the roles for women in the church.

In 1646 was appointed as the first Rector of the new Orange College of Breda, where he passed the remainder of his life and died. Archibald Alexander devotes a chapter of his Thoughts on Religious Experience to Rivet's "death-bed exercises".

== Works ==
A learned Reformed theologian (or, less accurately, a Calvinist) and a relentless apologist of the Reformed faith against the attacks of the Roman Catholic Church, Rivet was in his day the most influential member of the theological faculty of Leyden; and together with his colleagues he drew up, in 1625, the Synopsis purioris theologiae, a series of 52 academic disputations covering the main topics of Reformed theology. At Leyden Rivet also worked in the field of Old Testament exegesis.

His numerous writings are divided among polemics, exegesis, dogmatics, and edification. They were collected in three volumes (Rotterdam, 1651–53), one of the most notable being the Isagoge ad scripturam sacram Veteris et Novi Testamenti (Dort, 1616).

Other works:

- Le Resveille-matin des ministres, response aux demandes de J. Christi, chanoine théologal de Nantes,1600
- Eschantillons des principaux paradoxes de la Papauté, 1603
- Défense de la liberté chrestienne en l’usage sobre des viandes, contre la doctrine de la papauté maintenue par Georges l'Apostre, en son traité du Quaresme, 1605
- Démonstration de la vanité des causes et raisons par lesquelles Olivier Enguerrand, autrefois cordelier, depuis ministre en l'Eglise réformée de Chef-Boulonne et maintenant apostat, prétend colorer sa perfidie; pour response à la déclaration qu'il a naguères publiée, Saumur, 1607
- Le catholique orthodoxe opposé au catholique papiste, Saumur, 1616 (compilation of Sommaire et abrégé des controverses de nostre temps touchant la religion (1608) and Triomphe de la vérité, en suite du Sommaire des controverses (1610))
- La Défense des deux épistres et de la préface du livre de Ph. De Mornay intitulé: Le Mystère d'iniquité, 1612
- Critici sacri specimen, hoc est censurae doctorum tam ex orthodocis quam ex pontificis in scripta quae Patribus plerisque priscorum et pluriorum saeculorum vel affinxit incogitantia, vel supposuit impostura, accedunt prolegomena de patrum authoritate, errorum causis et nothorum notis, 1612
- Remarques et considérations sur la Response de Coëffeteau au Mystère d'iniquité (1615-1617)
- Oratio de bono pacis et concordiae in Eecclesia, 1620
- Meditationes XII in selecta aliquot Scripturae loca, 1622
- Statera quâ ponderatur Mantissae Laurentii Foreri jesuitae OEnipontani, Sectio una quam emisit adversus libellum cui titulus est Mysteria Patrum jesuitarum (under the name of Renatus Verdœus), 1627
- Lettres escrites à Madame de la Trémoille sur le changement de religion de M. le duc de la Trémoille, 1629
- Disputationes XIII de justâ et gratiosâ Dei dispensatione circa salutem generis humani, 1631
- Commentarius in Jonam; Praelectiones in cap. XX Exodi, 1632
- Oratio habito in auditorio solemni, 1632
- Exhortations de repentance et recognoissance, faites au sujet du siège de Maëstricht, 1632
- Theologicae et scolasticae exercitationes CXC in Genesim, 1633
- De origine Sabbathi, 1633
- Meditationes in VII psalmos poenitentiales, 1634
- Commentarii in librum secundum Mosis, qui exodus apud Graecos inscribitur, 1634
- Instruction préparatoire à la saincte cène; avec cinq prédications convenables en la matière, Leyde, 1634
- Jesuita vapulans, 1635
- Divers traités de piété sur quelques occasions du temps présent, 1637
- Méditation sur le Psaume XCI, pour servir d’antidote contre la peste et de précaution contre tous les dangers; avec une lettre sur la question s’il est loisible de s’éloigner des lieux infectés, 1638
- Suspiria poenitensis afflicti, 1638
- Apologia pro sanctissimâ Virgine Mariâ, 1639
- Les derniers vœux du Sacrificateur éternel, compris en sa prière contenue au XVIIe chapitre de saint Jehan, exposée en XVIII sermons, et une paraphrase; avec quelques autres petits traités, 1639
- Instruction chrestienne touchant les spectacles publics des comoedies et tragoedies, 1639
- Response à trois lettres du Sieur de la Milletière sur les moyens de réunion en la religion; avec la défense de Rivet contre les calomnies du Sr de la Milletière en son Catholique réformé, 1642
- Instruction du prince chrestien, 1642
- Animadversiones in Higonis Grotii annotata in Cassandri consultationem, 1642
- Examen animadversionum Grotii pro sui notis ad consultationem Cassandri, 1642
- Apologeticus pro suo de verae et sincerae pacis ecclesiae proposito, contra Grotii votum, 1643
- Decretum synodi Carentone habitae anno 1644, 1644
- Commentarius in Paslmorum propheticorum de mysteriis evangelicis dodecadem selectam, 1645
- Grotianae discussionis διάλυσις, 1646
- Apologia pro Hieronymi sententiâ de episcopis et presbyteris, 1646
- Question scélèbre s’il est nécessaire ou non que les filles soient sçavantes, Paris, 1646
- Epistolae apologeticae ad criminationes Amyraldi de gratiâ universali, 1648 (co-written with his brother Guillaume Rivet)
- Sur le chapitre XII de l’Epitre aux Romains, 1648
- Synopsis doctrinae de naturâ et gratiâ, excerpta ex Amyraldi tractatude predestinatione, 1649
- Lupi servati presbytari, viri doctissimi, qui ante annos 800, in Galliâ vixit de tribus questionnibus, 1650 (under the name of Renatus de Viraeus)
- La bonne vieillesse, représentée en une lettre latine d’A. Rivet à G. Rivet, son frère, et par lui traduite en français, 1652
