= Constantijn Huygens =

Dutch poet and composer (1596–1687)

Sir Constantijn Huygens
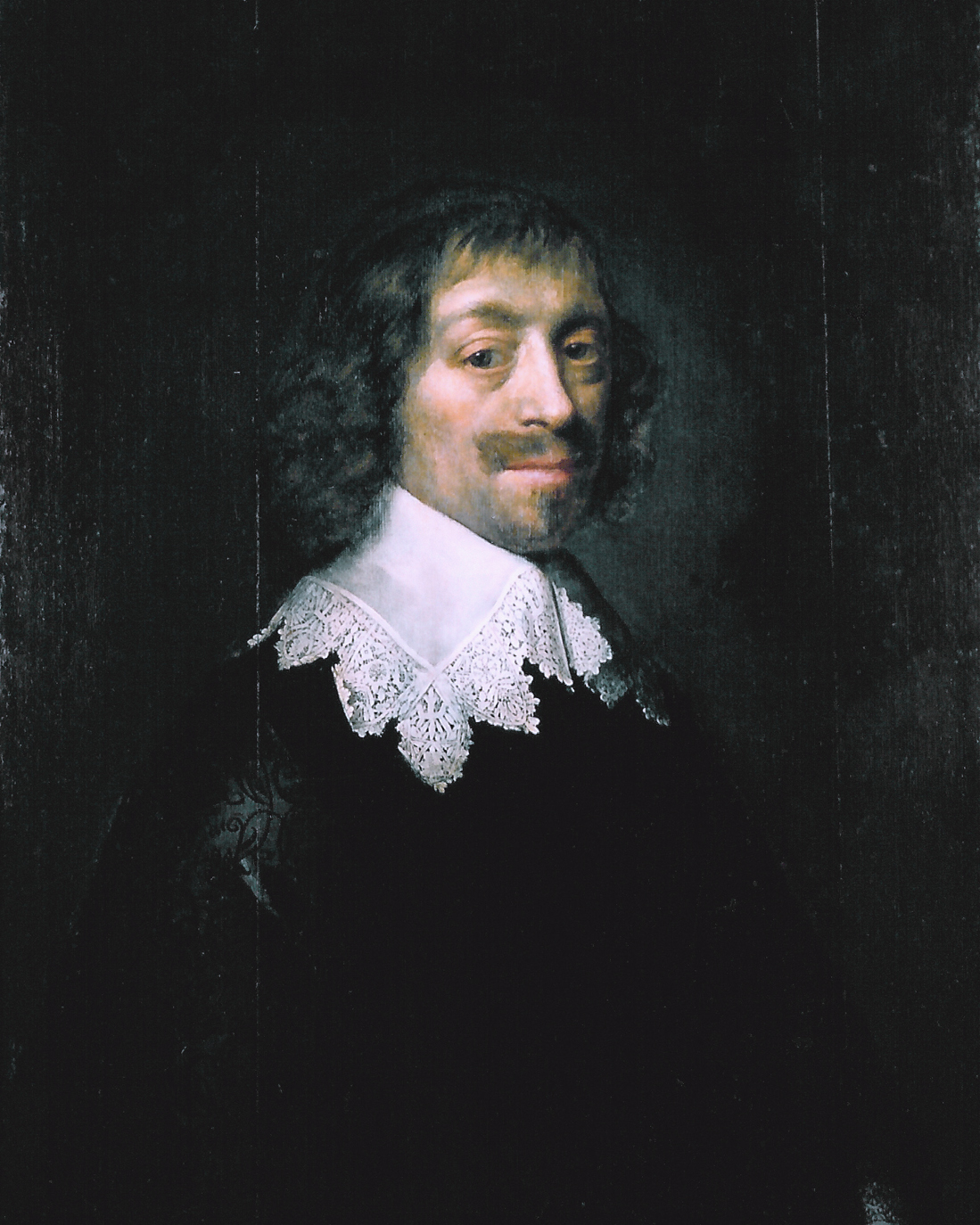
- Huygens, painted by Michiel Jansz van Mierevelt in 1641
- Born: September 4, 1596; The Hague, Dutch Republic
- Died: March 28, 1687 (aged 90); The Hague, Dutch Republic
- Resting place: Grote Kerk, The Hague
- Education: University of Leiden
- Occupations: Stadtholder; poet; composer; architect
- Spouse: Suzanna van Baerle
- Children: Christiaan Huygens, Constantijn Huygens Jr., Lodewijk Huygens, Philips Huygens, Susanna Huygens

Sir Constantijn Huygens, Lord of Zuilichem (/ˈhaɪɡənz/ HY-gənz, US also /ˈhɔɪɡənz/ HOY-gənz, Dutch: [ˈkɔnstɑntɛin ˈɦœyɣə(n)s]; 4 September 1596 – 28 March 1687), was a Dutch Golden Age poet and composer. He was also secretary to two Princes of Orange: Frederick Henry and William II, and the father of the scientist Christiaan Huygens.

== Biography ==
Constantijn Huygens was born in The Hague, the second son of Christiaan Huygens (senior), secretary of the Council of State, and Susanna Hoefnagel, niece of the Antwerp painter Joris Hoefnagel.

== Education ==
Constantijn was a gifted child. His brother Maurits and he were educated partly by their father and partly by carefully instructed governors. When he was five years old, Constantijn and his brother received their first musical education.

=== Music education ===
They started with singing lessons, and they learned their notes using gold-coloured buttons on their jackets. It is striking that Christiaan senior imparted the "modern" system of 7 note names to the boys, instead of the traditional, but much more complicated hexachord system. Two years later the first lessons on the viol started, followed by the lute and the harpsichord. Constantijn showed a particular acumen for the lute. At the age of eleven he was already asked to play for ensembles, and later—during his diplomatic travels—his lute playing was in demand; he was asked to play at the Danish Court and for James I of England, although they were not known for their musical patronage. In later years he also learnt the more modern guitar. In 1647 he published in Paris his Pathodia sacra et profana with his compositions of airs de cour in French, madrigals in Italian and Psalms in Latin.

=== Art instruction ===
They were also schooled in art through their parents' art collection, but also their connection to the magnificent collection of paintings in the Antwerp house of diamond and jewellery dealer, Gaspar Duarte (1584–1653), who was a Portuguese Jewish exile.

=== Language lessons ===
Constantijn also had a talent for languages. He learned French, Latin and Greek, and at a later age Italian, German and English. He learned by practice, the modern way of learning techniques. Constantijn received education in maths, law and logic and he learned how to handle a pike and a musket.

In 1614 Constantijn wrote his first Dutch poem, inspired by the French poet Guillaume de Salluste Du Bartas, in which he praises rural life. In his early 20s, he fell in love with Dorothea; however, their relationship did not last and Dorothea met someone else.

In 1616, Maurits and Constantijn started studies at Leiden University. Studying in Leiden was primarily seen as a way to build a social network. Shortly after, Maurits was called home to assist his father. Constantijn finished his studies in 1617 and returned home. This was followed by six weeks of training with Antonis de Hubert, a lawyer in Zierikzee. De Hubert was committed to the study of language and writing, having held consultations with Pieter Corneliszoon Hooft, Laurens Reael and Joost van den Vondel concerning language and orthography in 1623.

== Early career ==
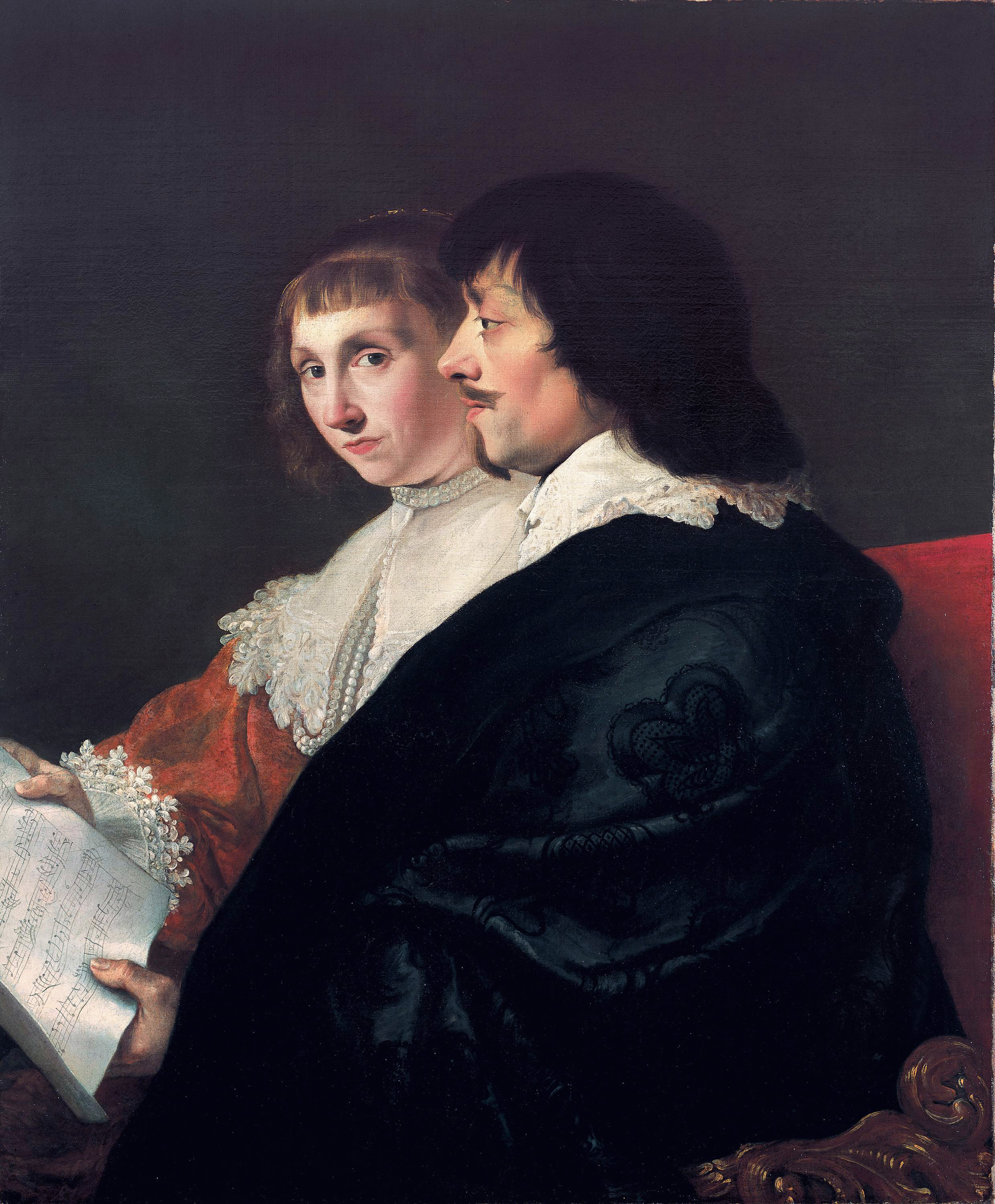
Susanna van Baerle (1599-1637), and her husband Constantijn Huygens (1596-1687), painted by Jacob van Campen

In the Spring of 1618 Constantijn found employment with Sir Dudley Carleton, the English envoy at the Court in The Hague. In the summer, he stayed in London in the house of the Dutch ambassador, Noël de Caron. During his time in London his social circle widened and he also learned to speak English. In 1620, towards the end of the Twelve Years' Truce, he travelled as a secretary of ambassador François van Aerssen to Venice, to gain support against the threat of renewed war. He was the only member of the legation who could speak Italian.

=== London ===
In January 1621, he traveled to England as the secretary of six envoys of the United Provinces with the object of persuading James I to support the German Protestant Union. They lodged in Lombard Street and were taken by coach to Whitehall Palace to King James and then to Prince Charles at St James's Palace where they realised they had delivered the letters for the prince to the king, and Huygens made an excuse of the poor light. On Shrove-Tuesday they saw a masque at Whitehall presented by the gentlemen of the Middle Temple. They returned in April of that year, Huygens with the king's gift of a gold chain worth £45. In December 1621 he left with another delegation, this time with the aim of requesting support for the United Provinces, returning after a year and two months in February 1623. There was yet another trip to England in 1624.

=== Muiderkring ===
He is often considered a member of what is known as the Muiderkring, a group of leading intellectuals gathered around the poet Pieter Corneliszoon Hooft, who met regularly at the castle of Muiden near Amsterdam. In 1619 Constantijn came into contact with Anna Roemers Visscher and with Pieter Corneliszoon Hooft. Huygens exchanged many poems with Anna. In 1621 a poetic exchange with Hooft also starts. Both would always try to exceed the other. In October of that year Huygens sent Jacob Cats a large poem in Dutch, entitled 't Voorhout, about a woodland near the Hague. In December he started writing 't Kostelick Mal, a satirical treatment of the nonsense of the current vogue.

In 1623, Huygens wrote his Printen, a description of several characteristics of people. This satirical, moralising work was one of the most difficult of Huygens's poems. In the same year Maria Tesselschade and Allard Crombalch were married. For this occasion verses were written by Huygens, Hooft and Vondel. During the festival, Constantijn flirted with Machteld of Camps. As a result of this he wrote the poem Vier en Vlam. In 1625 the work Otia, or Ledige Uren, was published. This work showcased his collected poems.

=== English knighthood and marriage ===
In 1622, when Constantijn stayed as a diplomat for more than one year in England, he was knighted by King James I. This marked the end of Constantijn's formative years, and of his youth. During his time in England, in December 1622, he was robbed of his papers and £200 in gold from his coach as he set out on the way to Newmarket.

Huygens was employed as a secretary to Frederick Henry, Prince of Orange, who—after the death of Maurits of Orange—was appointed as stadtholder. In 1626 Constantijn fell in love with Suzanna van Baerle after earlier courtship by the Huygens family to win her for his brother Maurits had failed. Constantijn wrote several sonnets for her, in which he calls her Sterre (Star). They wed on 6 April 1627.

Huygens describes their marriage in Dagh-werck, a description of one day. He worked on this piece, which contains almost 2000 lines, during the entire time they were married. In one of the preserved manuscripts of this work it appears Suzanna transcribed (or wrote herself) a substantial portion of the work, suggesting a close collaboration between husband and wife.

The couple had five children: in 1628 their first son, Constantijn Jr., in 1629 Christiaan, in 1631 Lodewijk and in 1633 Philips. In 1637 their daughter Suzanna was born; shortly after her birth their mother died.

=== Education of his sons and the new royal Prince ===
In 1645, his sons Constantijn Jr. and Christiaan began their studies in Leiden. In these years Prince Frederick Henry of Orange, Huygens's confidante and protector, became increasingly ill, and died in 1647. The new stadtholder, William II of Orange, greatly appreciated Huygens and gave him the estate of Zeelhem, but he died too in 1650.

The emphasis of Huygens's activities moved more and more to his presidency of the Council of the house of Orange, which was in the hands of the young Prince inheritor, a small baby. He traveled frequently during that time, in connection with his work. There were however strong disagreements between the baby's widowed grandmother Amalia van Solms, and its widowed mother (her daughter in law) Mary, Princess Royal, (4 November 1631 – 24 December 1660, aged 29) on even the name for christening the Dutch-English Royal newborn.

In 1657, his son Philips died after a short sickness during his Grand Tour while in Prussia. In that same year Huygens became seriously ill, but healed in a miraculous manner.

In 1680, Constantijn Jr. moved with his family out of the house of his father. To stop the gossiping that started shortly afterwards, Huygens wrote the poem Cluijs-werck, in which he shows a glimpse of the latter stages of his life.

== Later career and French knighthood ==
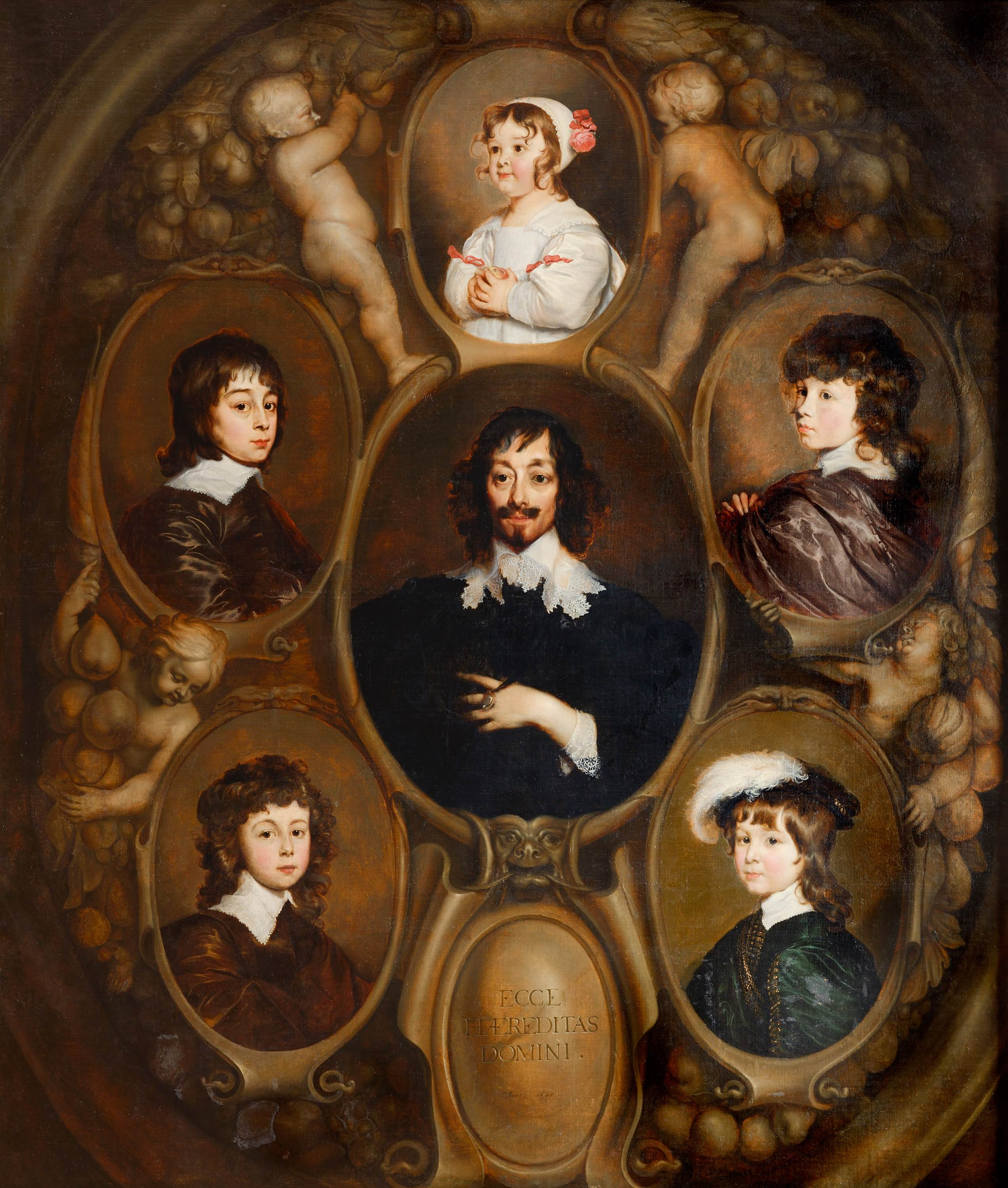
Huygens and his children by Adriaen Hanneman, Mauritshuis, The Hague

Huygens started a successful career despite his grief over the death of his wife (1638). In 1630 he was appointed to the Council and Exchequer, managing the estate of the Orange family. This job provided him with an income of about 1000 florins a year. In that same year he bought the heerlijkheid Zuilichem and became known as Lord of Zuilichem (in Dutch: Heer van Zuilichem). In 1632, Louis XIII of France - the protector of the famous exiled jurist Hugo Grotius - appointed him as Knight of the Order of Saint-Michel. In 1643 Huygens was granted the honor of displaying a golden lily on a blue field in his coat of arms.

In 1634 Huygens received from Prince Frederick Henry a piece of property in The Hague on the north side of the Binnenhof. The land was near the property of a good friend of Huygens, Count Johan Maurits of Nassau-Siegen, who built his house, the Mauritshuis, around the same time and using the same architect, Huygens's friend Jacob van Campen.

=== Correspondence ===
Aside from his membership in the Muiderkring (which was not as formerly supposed, an official club), at the start of the 1630s he was also in touch with René Descartes, with Rembrandt, and the painter Jan Lievens. He became friends with John Donne, and translated his poems into Dutch. He was unable to write poetry for months because of his anguish over his wife's death, but eventually he composed, inspired by Petrarch, the sonnet Op de dood van Sterre (On the death of Sterre), which was well received. He added the poem to his Dagh-werck, which he left unfinished: the day he has described has not ended yet, but his Sterre is already dead. After sending the unfinished work to different friends for approval, he eventually published it in 1658 as part of his Koren-bloemen.

Huygens also corresponded with Margaret Croft and Elizabeth Dudley, Countess of Löwenstein, ladies in waiting to Elizabeth Stuart, Queen of Bohemia, and Mary Woodhouse, a friend made in London in 1622.

== Hofwijck ==
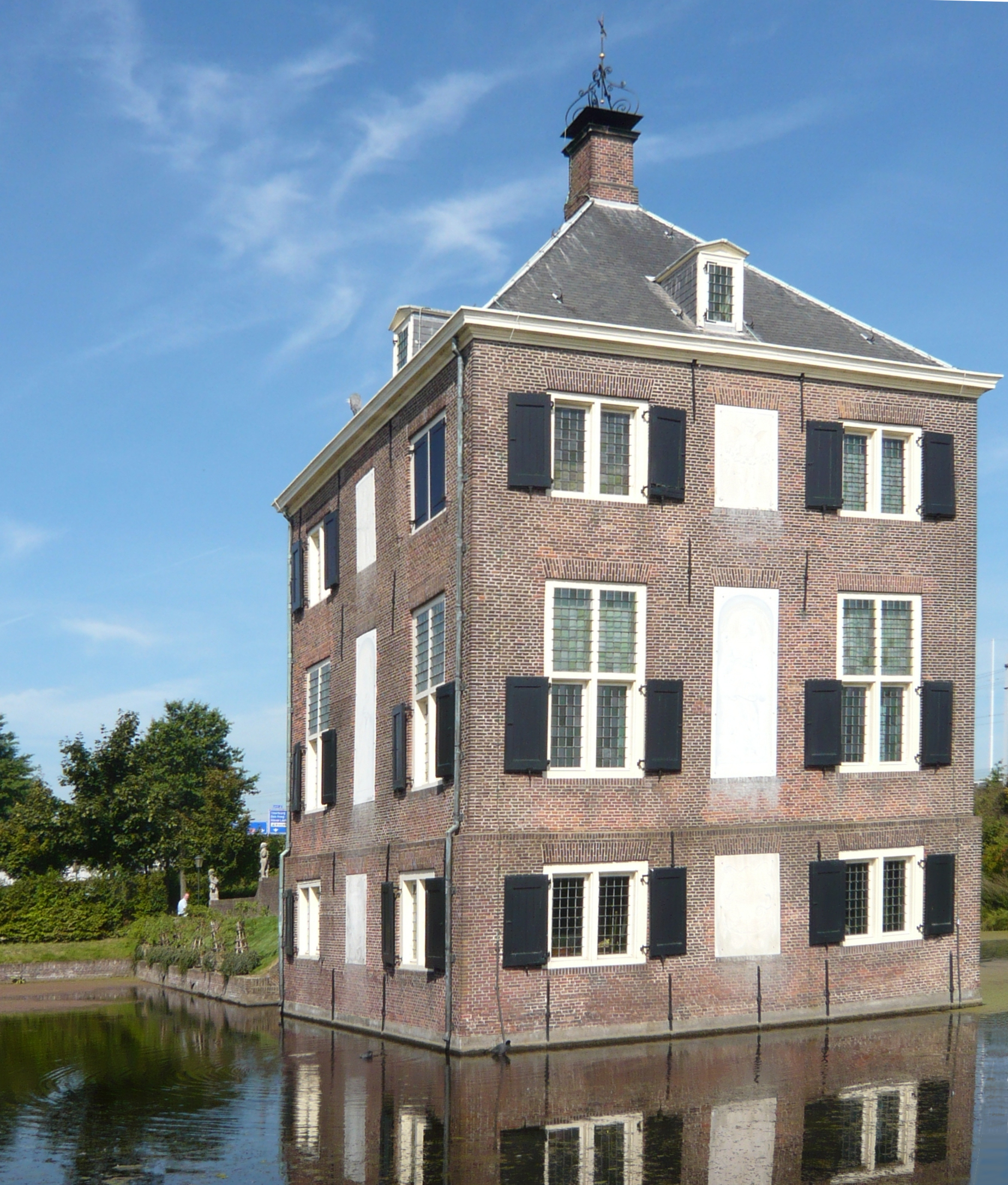
Hofwijck, the country retreat of Huygens and his family.

After a couple of years as a widower, Huygens bought a piece of land in Voorburg and commissioned the building of Hofwijck. Hofwijck was inaugurated in 1642 in the company of friends and relatives. Here Huygens hoped to escape the stress at court in The Hague, forming his own "court", indicated by the name of the house which has a double meaning: Hof (=Court or courtyard) Wijck (=avoid or township). In that same year, his brother Maurits died. Due to his grief Huygens wrote little Dutch poetry, but he continued to write epigrams in Latin. Shortly afterwards, he began writing Dutch pun poems, which are very playful by nature. In 1644 and 1645 Huygens began more serious work. As a new year's present for Leonore Hellemans, he composed the Heilige Daghen, a series of sonnets on the Christian holidays. In 1644, a garlanded portrait of Huygens was painted by Daniel Seghers and Jan Cossiers: it is now in the Mauritshuis. In 1647 he published another work, in which play and seriousness are united, Ooghentroost, addressed to Lucretia of Trello, who was losing her sight and who was already half-blind. The poem was offered as consolation.

From 1650 to 1652 Huygens wrote the poem Hofwijck in which he described the joys of living outside the city. It is thought that Huygens wrote his poetry as a testament to himself, a memento mori, because Huygens lost so many dear friends and family during this time: Hooft (1647), Barlaeus (1648), Maria Tesschelschade (1649) and Descartes (1650).

== Writing ==
He still tried to find time to publish more of his work. In 1647 a number of Huygens's musical creations, Pathodia sacra et profana, was published in Paris. It contained vocal compositions in Latin (Psalms), French, and Italian (secular texts). The work was dedicated to Utricia Ogle, a niece of an English diplomat.

In 1648 Huygens wrote Twee ongepaerde handen for harpsichord. This work was dedicated to Marietje Casembroot, a twenty-five-year-old harpsichord player, with whom he shared his love of music.

In 1657 the collected work of his Dutch poems, the Koren-bloemen appears. Some of its contents contain: Heilighe Daghen (1645), Ooghen-troost (1647), Hofwijck (1653) and Trijntje Cornelis (1653). This last work, Trijntje Cornelis, is an explosion of Huygens's creativity. It testifies to the rare language - and expressive capacity - of the author. Considering that the piece was written in a rather short time, it can be considered work of an enormous performance. Since his mother Suzanna was from Antwerp, he visited there often and Trijntje Cornelis takes place in Antwerp.

In 1660 his daughter Suzanna married her cousin, Philips Doublet, son of Huygens's sister Geertruijd. In 1661, a grandfather by now, Huygens was sent to France by the circle of tutors of William III, to recover possession of the county of Orange. The county was returned to the family of Orange-Nassau in 1665 and Huygens returned to the Netherlands.

On his return, Huygens designed the new sand road in The Hague, running through the dunes to Scheveningen. He had already planned this road in 1653, and wrote about it in his work the Zee-straet. The road was made according to Huygens's design.

In 1676 the second edition of the Koren-bloemen appeared, a collected work containing 27 books. New in this edition were the Zee-straet, the Mengelingh (a section of serious poems written after 1657) and seven books with snel-dichten (quick poems). As he was older now, Huygens found refuge in music. He wrote around 769 compositions during his lifetime.

== Legacy ==
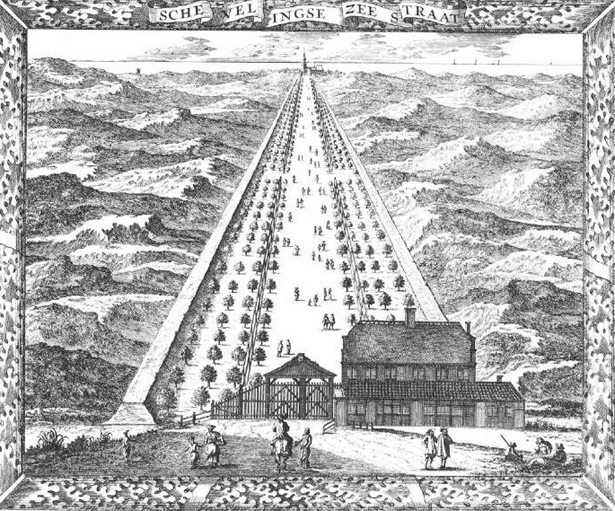
Drawing of the Zee-straet

Constantijn Huygens died in The Hague on Good Friday, 28 March 1687 at the age of 90. A week later he was buried in the Grote Kerk in the Hague. His son, the scientist Christiaan Huygens was later buried with his father.

In 1947 a literary award was created, the Constantijn Huygens Prize, to honor his legacy.

== Constantijn Huygens in fiction ==
Constantijn Huygens plays a major part in Brian Howell's novel, The Curious Case of Jan Torrentius (Zagava, Düsseldorf, 2017), an expanded edition of his previous collection of novellas, The Stream and The Torrent: Jan Torrentius and The Followers of the Rosy Cross: Vol.1 (Zagava/Les Éditions de L'Oubli, 2014)

== Bibliography ==
- Spaense wijsheit (without year)
- 1621 Batava Tempe, dat is 't Voor-hout van 's-Gravenhage
- 1623 De uytlandighe herder
- 1622 Kerkuria mastix, satyra, Dat is, 't costelick mal
- 1624 Stede-stemmen en dorpen
- 1624 Zedeprinten
- 1625 Otiorum libri sex
- 1638 Dagh-werck
- 1641 Ghebruyck en onghebryck van 't orgel
- 1644 Momenta desultoria (republished in 1655)
- 1647 Eufrasia, Ooghentroost. Aen Parthenine, bejaerde maecht, over de verduysteringh van haer een ooghe
- 1647 Heilighe daghen
- 1647 Pathodia sacra et profana
- 1653 Trijntje Cornelis
- 1653 Vitaulium. Hofwijck, Hofstede vanden Heere van Zuylichem onder Voorburgh
- 1656-1657 translated proverbs
- 1658 Korenbloemen (republished in 1672)
- 1667 Zee-straet
- 1841 Cluys-werck (published by W. J. A. Jonckbloet)

== See also ==
- Hofwijck
- Constantijn Huygens, Jr.
- Christiaan Huygens
- Sutherland Loan
