= Discourse on the Method =

1637 treatise by Descartes

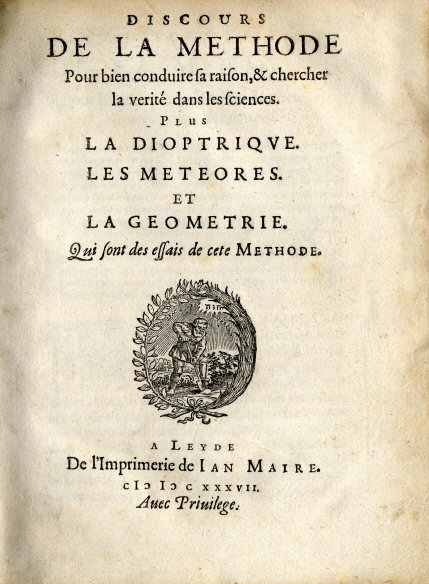
- Discourse on the Method
- Author: René Descartes
- Original title: Discours de la Méthode Pour bien conduire sa raison, et chercher la vérité dans les sciences
- Language: French
- Subject: Philosophy and autobiography
- Publication date: 1637
- Original text: Discours de la Méthode Pour bien conduire sa raison, et chercher la vérité dans les sciences at French Wikisource
- Translation: Discourse on the Method at Wikisource

Discourse on the Method of Rightly Conducting One's Reason and of Seeking Truth in the Sciences (French: Discours de la Méthode pour bien conduire sa raison, et chercher la vérité dans les sciences) is a philosophical and autobiographical treatise published by René Descartes in 1637. It is best known as the source of the famous quotation "Je pense, donc je suis" ("I think, therefore I am", or "I am thinking, therefore I exist"), which occurs in Part IV of the work. A similar argument without this precise wording is found in Meditations on First Philosophy (1641), and a Latin version of the same statement, "Cogito, ergo sum", is found in Principles of Philosophy (1644).

Discourse on the Method is one of the most influential works in the history of modern philosophy, and important to the development of natural sciences. In this work, Descartes tackles the problem of skepticism, which had previously been studied by other philosophers. While addressing some of his predecessors and contemporaries, Descartes modified their approach to account for a truth he found to be incontrovertible; he started his line of reasoning by doubting everything, so as to assess the world from a fresh perspective, clear of any preconceived notions.

The book was originally published in Leiden, in the Netherlands. Later, it was translated into Latin (Dissertatio de Methodo recte utendi ratione, et veritatem in scientiis investigandi) and published in 1656 in Amsterdam. The book was intended as an introduction to three works: La Dioptrique, Les Météores, and La Géométrie. La Géométrie contains Descartes's initial concepts that later developed into the Cartesian coordinate system. The text was written and published in French so as to reach a wider audience than Latin, the language in which most philosophical and scientific texts were written and published at that time, would have allowed. Most of Descartes's other works were written in Latin.

Together with Meditations on First Philosophy, Principles of Philosophy and Rules for the Direction of the Mind, it forms the base of the epistemology known as Cartesianism.

== Organization ==
The book is divided into six parts, described in the author's preface as:

1. Various considerations touching the Sciences
2. The principal rules of the Method which the Author has discovered
3. Certain of the rules of Morals which he has deduced from this Method
4. The reasonings by which he establishes the existence of God and of the Human Soul
5. The order of the Physical questions which he has investigated, and, in particular, the explication of the motion of the heart and of some other difficulties pertaining to Medicine, as also the difference between the soul of man and that of the brutes
6. What the Author believes to be required in order to greater advancement in the investigation of Nature than has yet been made, with the reasons that have induced him to write

=== Part I: Various scientific considerations ===
Descartes begins by allowing himself some wit:

Good sense is, of all things among men, the most equally distributed; for every one thinks himself so abundantly provided with it, that those even who are the most difficult to satisfy in everything else, do not usually desire a larger measure of this quality than they already possess.

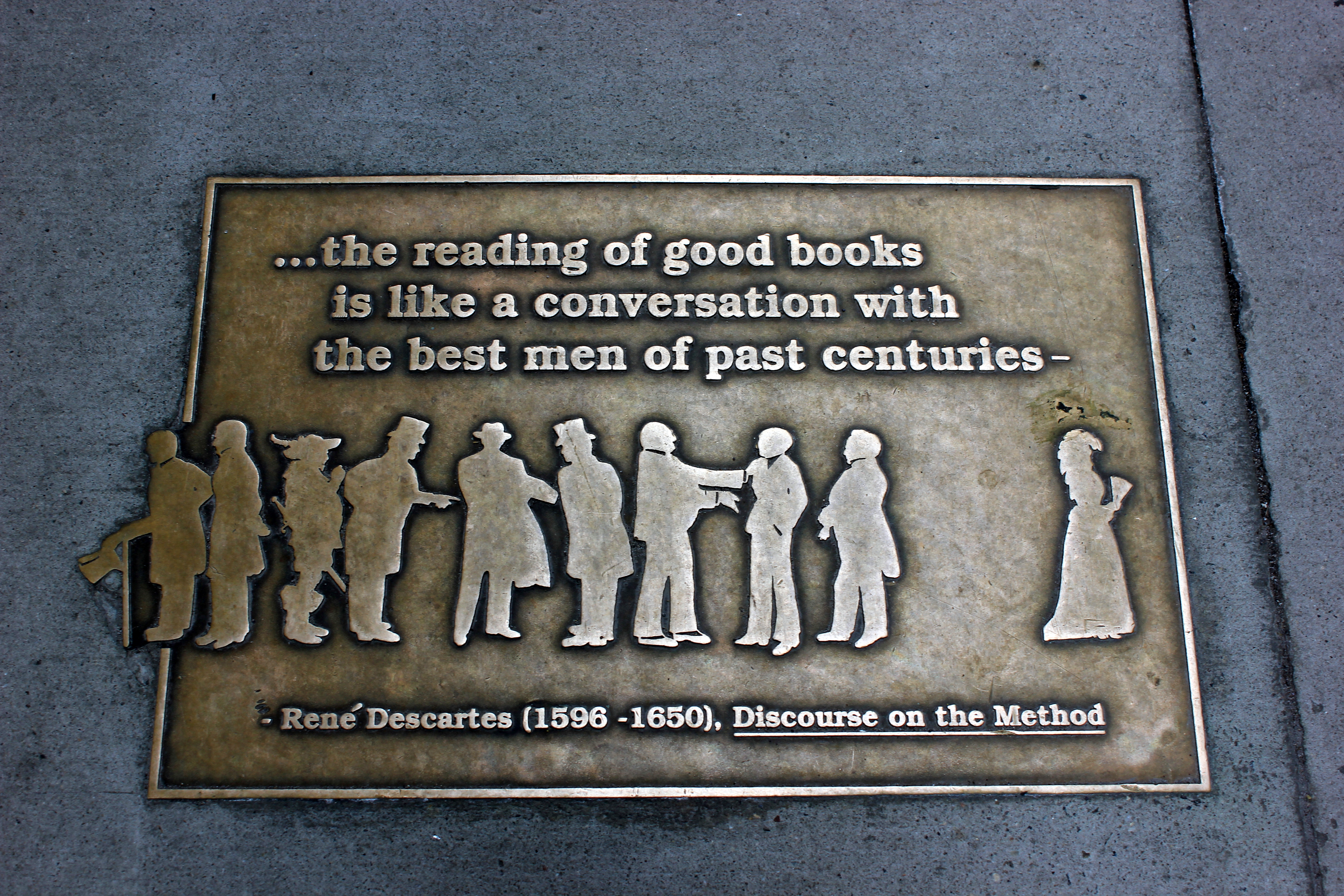
"... the reading of good books is like a conversation with the best men of past centuries–" (Discourse part I, AT p. 5)

A similar observation can be found in Hobbes, when he writes about human abilities, specifically wisdom and "their own wit": "But this proveth rather that men are in that point equal, than unequal. For there is not ordinarily a greater sign of the equal distribution of anything than that every man is contented with his share", but also in Montaigne, whose formulation indicates that it was a commonplace at the time: "Tis commonly said that the justest portion Nature has given us of her favors is that of sense; for there is no one who is not contented with his share." Descartes continues with a warning:

For to be possessed of a vigorous mind is not enough; the prime requisite is rightly to apply it. The greatest minds, as they are capable of the highest excellences, are open likewise to the greatest aberrations; and those who travel very slowly may yet make far greater progress, provided they keep always to the straight road, than those who, while they run, forsake it.

Descartes describes his disappointment with his education: "[A]s soon as I had finished the entire course of study ... I found myself involved in so many doubts and errors, that I was convinced I had advanced no farther ... than the discovery at every turn of my own ignorance." He notes his special delight with mathematics, and contrasts its strong foundations to "the disquisitions of the ancient moralists [which are] towering and magnificent palaces with no better foundation than sand and mud."

=== Part II: Principal rules of the Method ===
Descartes was in Germany, attracted thither by the wars in that country, and describes his intent by a "building metaphor". He observes that buildings, cities or nations that have been planned by a single hand are more elegant and commodious than those that have grown organically. He resolves not to build on old foundations, nor to lean upon principles which he had taken on faith in his youth. Descartes seeks to ascertain the true method by which to arrive at the knowledge of whatever lies within the compass of his powers. He presents four precepts:

The first was never to accept anything for true which I did not clearly know to be such; that is to say, carefully to avoid precipitancy and prejudice, and to comprise nothing more in my judgment than what was presented to my mind so clearly and distinctly as to exclude all ground of doubt.

The second, to divide each of the difficulties under examination into as many parts as possible, and as might be necessary for its adequate solution.

The third, to conduct my thoughts in such order that, by commencing with objects the simplest and easiest to know, I might ascend by little and little, and, as it were, step by step, to the knowledge of the more complex; assigning in thought a certain order even to those objects which in their own nature do not stand in a relation of antecedence and sequence.

And the last, in every case to make enumerations so complete, and reviews so general, that I might be assured that nothing was omitted.

=== Part III: Morals and Maxims of conducting the Method ===
Descartes uses the analogy of rebuilding a house from secure foundations, and extends the analogy to the idea of needing a temporary abode while his own house is being rebuilt. Descartes adopts the following "three or four" maxims in order to remain effective in the "real world" while experimenting with his method of radical doubt. They form a rudimentary belief system from which to act before his new system is fully developed:

# The first was to obey the laws and customs of my country, adhering firmly to the faith in which, by the grace of God, I had been educated from my childhood; and regulating my conduct in every other matter according to the most moderate opinions, and the farthest removed from extremes, which should happen to be adopted in practice with general consent of the most judicious of those among whom I might be living.

1. Be as firm and resolute in my actions as I was able.
2. Endeavor always to conquer myself rather than fortune, and change my desires rather than the order of the world, and in general, accustom myself to the persuasion that, except our own thoughts, there is nothing absolutely in our power; so that when we have done our best in things external to us, our ill-success cannot possibly be failure on our part.

Finally, Descartes states his resolute belief that there is no better use of his time than to cultivate his reason and to advance his knowledge of the truth according to his method.

=== Part IV: Proof of God and the Soul ===
Applying the method to itself, Descartes challenges his own reasoning and reason itself. But Descartes believes three things are not susceptible to doubt and the three support each other to form a stable foundation for the method. He cannot doubt that something has to be there to do the doubting: "I think, therefore I am". The method of doubt cannot doubt reason as it is based on reason itself. By reason there exists a God, and God is the guarantor that reason is not misguided. Descartes supplies three different proofs for the existence of God, including what is now referred to as the ontological proof of the existence of God.

=== Part V: Physics, the heart, and the soul of man and animals ===
Descartes briefly sketches how in an unpublished treatise (published posthumously as Le Monde) he had laid out his ideas regarding the laws of nature, the sun and stars, the moon as the cause of "ebb and flow" (meaning the tides), gravitation, light, and heat. Describing his work on light, he states:

[I] expounded at considerable length what the nature of that light must be which is found in the sun and the stars, and how thence in an instant of time it traverses the immense spaces of the heavens.

His work on such physico-mechanical laws is, however, framed as applying not to our world but to a theoretical "new world" created by God

somewhere in the imaginary spaces [with] matter sufficient to compose ... [a "new world" in which He] ... agitate[d] variously and confusedly the different parts of this matter, so that there resulted a chaos as disordered as the poets ever feigned, and after that did nothing more than lend his ordinary concurrence to nature, and allow her to act in accordance with the laws which he had established.

Descartes does this "to express my judgment regarding ... [his subjects] with greater freedom, without being necessitated to adopt or refute the opinions of the learned." (Descartes's hypothetical world would be a deistic universe.)

He goes on to say that he "was not, however, disposed, from these circumstances, to conclude that this world had been created in the manner I described; for it is much more likely that God made it at the first such as it was to be." Despite this admission, it seems that Descartes's project for understanding the world was that of re-creating creation—a cosmological project which aimed, through Descartes's particular brand of experimental method, to show not merely the possibility of such a system, but to suggest that this way of looking at the world—one with (as Descartes saw it) no assumptions about God or nature—provided the only basis upon which he could see knowledge progressing (as he states in Book II).

Thus, in Descartes's work, we can see some of the fundamental assumptions of modern cosmology in evidence—the project of examining the historical construction of the universe through a set of quantitative laws describing interactions which would allow the ordered present to be constructed from a chaotic past.

He goes on to the motion of the blood in the heart and arteries, endorsing the findings of "a physician of England" about the circulation of blood, referring to William Harvey and his work De motu cordis in a marginal note. But then he disagrees strongly about the function of the heart as a pump, ascribing the motive power of the circulation to heat rather than muscular contraction. He describes that these motions seem to be totally independent of what we think, and concludes that our bodies are separate from our souls.

He does not seem to distinguish between mind, spirit, and soul, all of which he identifies with our faculty for rational thinking. Hence the term "I think, therefore I am." All three of these words (particularly "mind" and "soul") can be signified by the single French term âme.

=== Part VI: Prerequisites for advancing the investigation of Nature ===
Descartes begins by obliquely referring to the recent trial of Galileo for heresy and the Church's condemnation of heliocentrism; he explains that for these reasons he has held back his own treatise from publication. However, he says, because people have begun to hear of his work, he is compelled to publish these small parts of it (that is, the Discourse, La Dioptrique, Les Météores, and La Géométrie) in order that people not wonder why he does not publish.

The discourse ends with some discussion of scientific experimentation: Descartes believes that experimentation is indispensable, time-consuming, and yet not easily delegated to others. He exhorts the reader to investigate the claims laid out in Dioptrique, Météores, and Géométrie and communicate their findings or criticisms to his publisher; he commits to publishing any such queries he receives along with his answers.

== Influencing future science ==
Skepticism had previously been discussed by philosophers such as Sextus Empiricus, Al-Kindi, Al-Ghazali, Francisco Sánchez and Michel de Montaigne. Descartes started his line of reasoning by doubting everything, so as to assess the world from a fresh perspective, clear of any preconceived notions or influences. This is summarized in the book's first precept to "never to accept anything for true which I did not clearly know to be such". This method of pro-foundational skepticism is considered to be the start of modern philosophy.

== See also ==
- Mathesis universalis
- Great Conversation
