= Bagshot Park =

Royal residence in Surrey, England

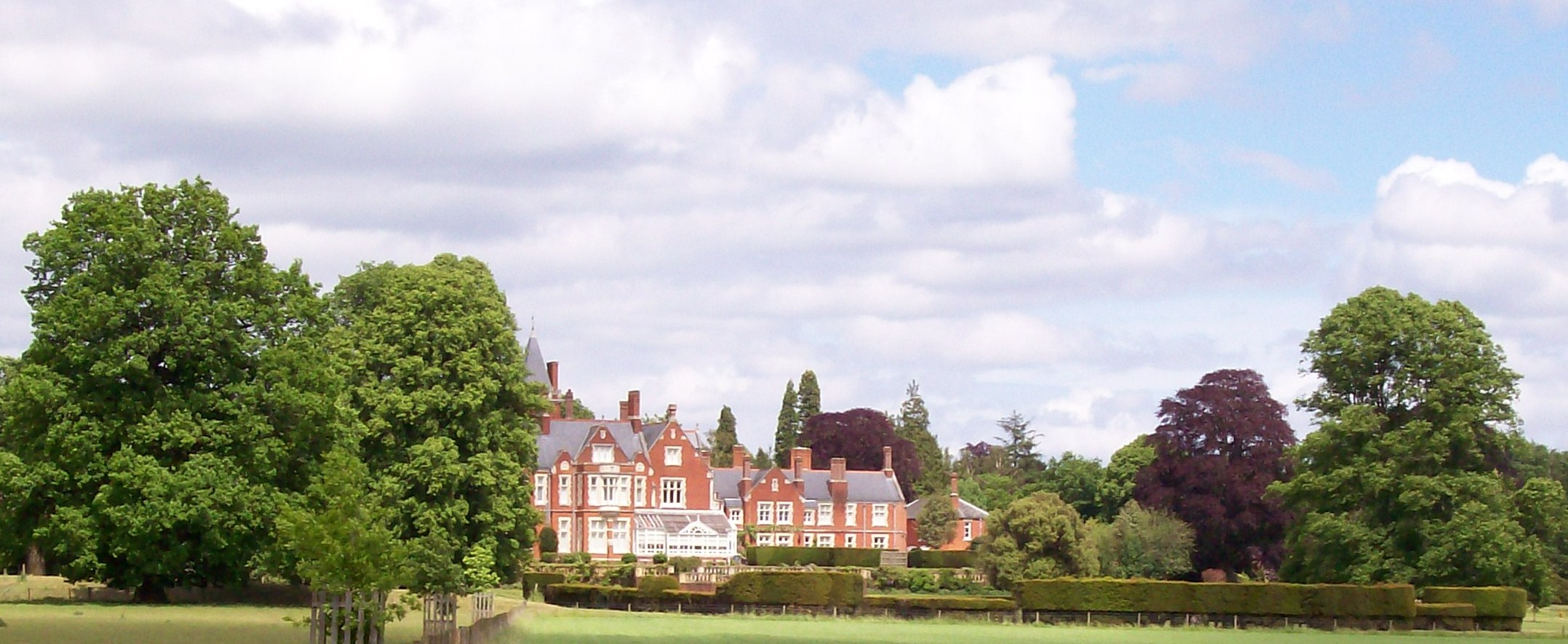
- The house from the park

- Location within Surrey

General information
- Coordinates: 51°22′14″N 0°41′46″W
- Current tenants: The Duke and Duchess of Edinburgh
- Completed: 1879
- Owner: The Crown Estate

Listed Building – Grade II
- Official name: Bagshot Park Mansion
- Designated: 4 August 1976
- Reference no.: 1030005

National Register of Historic Parks and Gardens
- Official name: Bagshot Park
- Designated: 27 February 1998
- Reference no.: 1001381

Bagshot Park is a royal residence located near Bagshot, a village 11 miles (18 km) south of Windsor. It is on Bagshot Heath, a 50-square-mile (130 km^{2}) tract of formerly open land in Surrey and Berkshire. Bagshot Park occupies 51 acres (21 ha) within the designated area of Windsor Great Park.

Built in 1879, the Mansion House was listed Grade II in 1976, as a building of special architectural or historic interest. Set upon the site of an earlier mansion, the present edifice was built with red brick and stone dressings in Tudor gothic style, for Prince Arthur, Duke of Connaught and Strathearn. Side and rear extensions were added in the late 19th and early 20th centuries. The landscaped grounds are also Grade II listed on the Register of Historic Parks and Gardens.

== History ==
Prince Henry came to Bagshot Lodge on 4 September 1609 and gave £1 to the musicians who entertained him. In 1612 King James appointed Noël de Caron as Keeper of the Park, a post he kept until his death in 1624. The Lodge was rebuilt between 1631 and 1633 as one of a series of small lodges designed for Charles I by Inigo Jones. It was remodelled between 1766 and 1772 according to designs of James Paine for George Keppel, the 3rd Earl of Albemarle, and altered in 1798 by Sir John Soane for the Duke of Clarence (later King William IV), who lived there until 1816.

Bagshot Park was subsequently used by Prince William Frederick, Duke of Gloucester, nephew of King George III. The Duke added pieces of property between the estate and Sunningdale; his widow, Princess Mary, daughter of King George III, continued to live there after his death until she moved out in 1847. The original house was demolished in 1877–78.

A new building with 120 rooms was completed in 1879. The 1881 census records an equerry and 26 servants living in the main house: an under butler, a housekeeper, four valets, two lady's maids, two dressers, a cook, three kitchen maids, three housemaids, three footmen, a page, a porter, a scullery maid, two other junior posts and a soldier. A coachman and seven grooms lived in the stables. Two other domestic staff lived in one of the lodges, three agricultural workers lived in another, and one gardener was recorded as living on the estate. From 1880 this was the principal residence of Prince Arthur, Duke of Connaught and Strathearn, a son of Queen Victoria. The Duke, who was Governor General of Canada from 1911 until 1916, died at Bagshot Park in 1942. The property had been in grace and favour occupation.

Following the Duke's death, Bagshot Park was requisitioned by the Army for the Auxiliary Territorial Service (later to become the WRAC) to use as their Staff College. This closed at the end of the Second World War.

In 1946 George VI offered the house to the Royal Army Chaplains' Department to be used as a Church House and Chaplains' Depot. The Army Chaplains were in residence from 1947 but relocated to Andover, Hampshire, in April 1996, shortly before the then Earl and Countess of Wessex took over the tenancy. The Army Chaplains famously placed a notice by the pond reading "Please do not walk on the water". The original sign was removed when the chaplains left, but a new one, made by J. M. J. Holland Chairmakers and given to the Earl of Wessex, has replaced it.

Although the house was criticised as ugly by the architectural historian Nikolaus Pevsner, it was said to be the most adventurous royal house to be created since the death of Albert, the Prince Consort of Queen Victoria, in 1861. It is also a remarkable monument in the history of Indian taste in Britain: an Indian billiard room wing, which inspired the more famous Durbar Room at Osborne House, was prefabricated in India and installed in the 1880s. This was a result of the Duke of Connaught's Indian tour, when the Duke met John Lockwood Kipling and asked him to design and oversee the installation of a billiard room in Indian taste. The Indian craftsmen who assembled and installed the room at Bagshot were housed in a tent in the grounds. The work took two years and was a wedding gift from Indian princes to the Duke and Duchess of Connaught.

== Lease to Prince Edward, Duke of Edinburgh ==
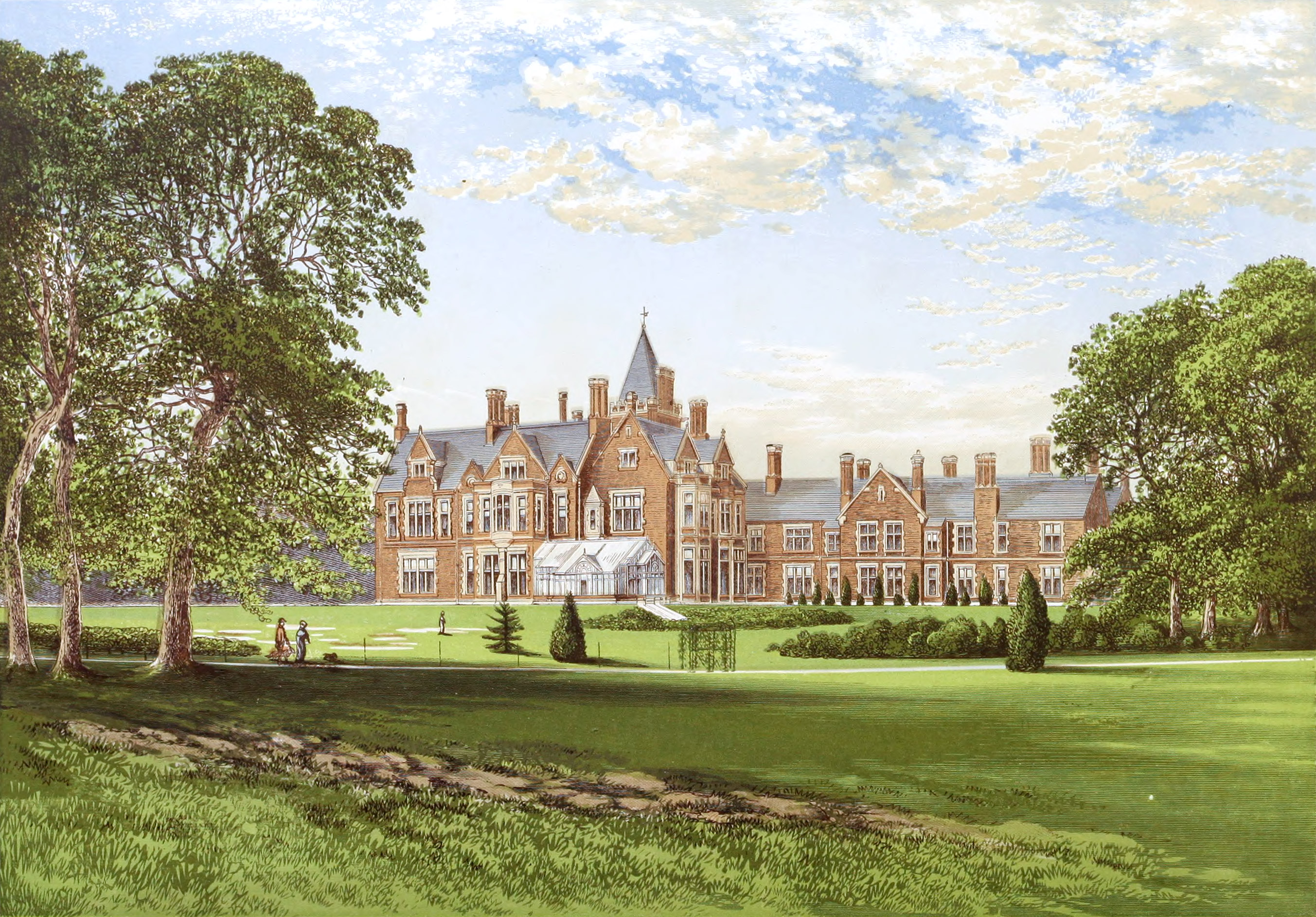
Bagshot Park in the 1880s

In March 1998, Bagshot Park and a block of stables and Sunningdale Lodge were leased by the Crown Estate to Prince Edward for 50 years. The house was renovated as a residence for the prince. The renovation was partly funded by the Crown Estate and partly funded by Prince Edward. The renovation was originally estimated to cost £2.18m, with £1.6m from the Crown Estate and the remainder being paid by the prince. The National Audit Office (NAO) report on the transaction stated that the final cost of renovations was £2.98m; the Crown Estate paid £1.6m and the estimated excess of £1.38m was paid by Prince Edward. The prince rented it from the Crown Estate initially for £5,000 a year then after renovation rising to £90,000 a year subject to 15-year rent reviews linked to RPI. According to the NAO report, the property leased by the prince does not include commercial farmland or woodland. The lease agreement permits subletting of the stable block. In June 2026, it was revealed in the NAO report that Edward had received private income from renting out the stable block on the estate to a third party until 2020.

In 2007, Prince Edward extended the lease to 150 years for £5m. The extended lease requires Edward to pay a nominal peppercorn rent on Bagshot Park rather than a market-rate annual rental. The premium paid for the lease extension was "market tested" by the Crown Estate, and the lease places restrictions on property use due to its historic character, but it imposes no conditions on future sale beyond ensuring a buyer can maintain the estate, meaning Edward could profit if he sold the leasehold.
