= La Dioptrique =

Treatise by Rene Descartes

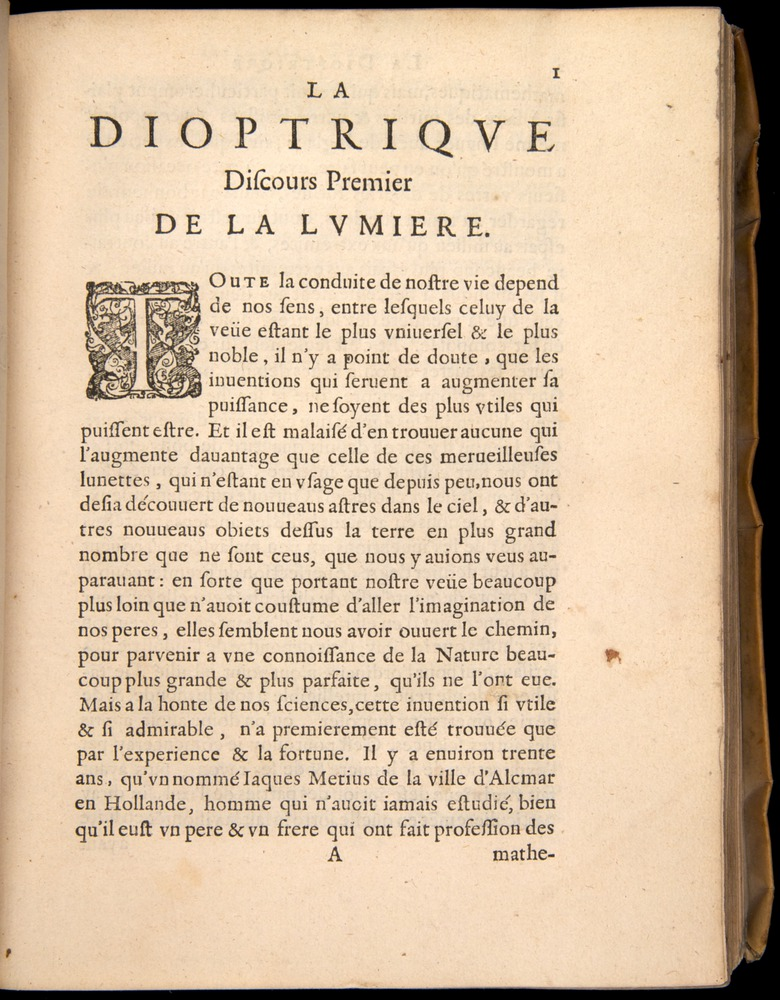
First page of La Dioptrique by René Descartes

La Dioptrique (usually translated in English as Optics, or more literally Dioptrics) is a short treatise by René Descartes. It was published in 1637 included in one of the Essays written with Discourse on the Method. In this essay Descartes uses various models to understand the properties of light. This essay is known as Descartes's greatest contribution to optics, as it is the first publication of the Law of Refraction.

== First Discourse: On Light ==
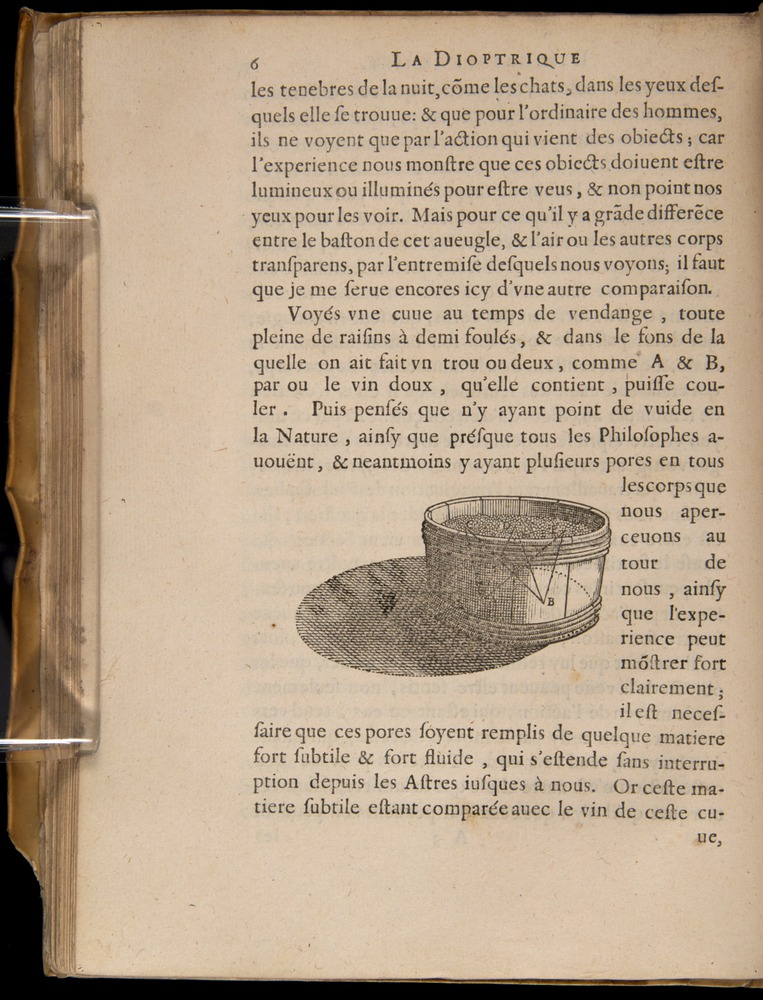
Page of Descartes's La Dioptrique with the wine vat example.

The first discourse captures Descartes's theories on the nature of light. In the first model, he compares light to a stick that allows a blind person to discern his environment through touch:

You have only to consider that the differences which a blind man notes among trees, rocks, water, and similar things through the medium of his stick do not seem less to him than those among red, yellow, green, and all the other colors seem to us; and that nevertheless these differences are nothing other, in all these bodies, than the diverse ways of moving, or of resisting the movements of, this stick.

Descartes's second model on light uses his theory of the elements to demonstrate the rectilinear transmission of light as well as the movement of light through solid objects. He uses a metaphor of wine flowing through a vat of grapes, then exiting through a hole at the bottom of the vat:

Now consider that, since there is no vacuum in Nature as almost all the Philosophers affirm, and since there are nevertheless many pores in all the bodies that we perceive around us, as experiment can show quite clearly, it is necessary that these pores be filled with some very subtle and very fluid material, extending without interruption from the stars and planets to us. Thus, this subtle material being compared with the wine in that vat, and the less fluid or heavier parts, of the air as well as of other transparent bodies, being compared with the bunches of grapes which are mixed in, you will easily understand the following: Just as the parts of this wine ... tend to go down in a straight line through the hole [and other holes in the bottom of the vat] ... at the very instant that it is open ... without any of those actions being impeded by the others, nor by the resistance of the bunches of grapes in this vat ... in the same way, all of the parts of the subtle material, which are touched by the side of the sun that faces us, tend in a straight line towards our eyes at the very instant that we open them, without these parts impeding each other, and even without their being impeded by the heavier particles of transparent bodies which are between the two.

== Second Discourse: On Refraction ==
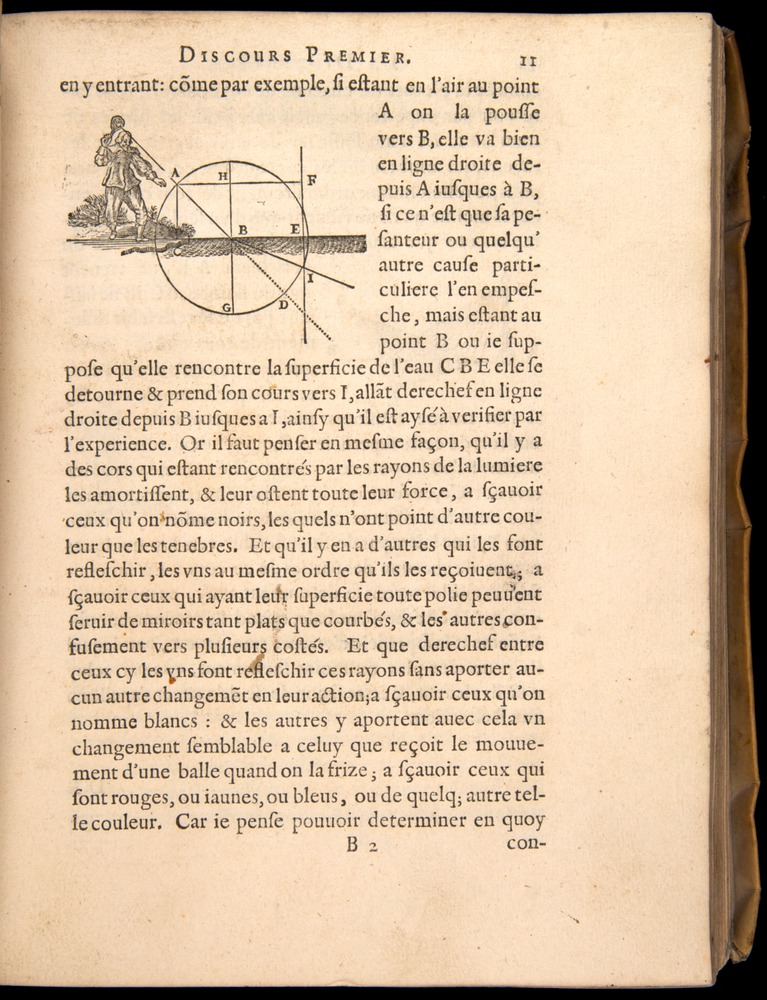
Page of Descartes's La Dioptrique with the tennis ball example.

Descartes uses a tennis ball to create a proof for the laws of reflection and refraction in his third model. This was important because he was using real-world objects (in this case, a tennis ball) to construct mathematical theory. Descartes's third model creates a mathematical equation for the Law of Refraction, characterized by the angle of incidence equalling the angle of refraction. In today's notation, the law of refraction states,
$$\sin i = n \sin r ,$$
where i is the angle of incidence, r is the angle of refraction, and n is the index of refraction. Using a tennis ball, Descartes would compare the projection of a ray of light to the way a ball moves when it is thrown up against another object.

== Controversy ==
The astronomer Jean-Baptiste Morin was noted as one of the first people to question Descartes's method in creating his theories.

... Descartes would not accept Morin's objections that the demonstrations in the Dioptric are circular or that the proposed explanations are artificial. He grants that 'to prove some effects by a certain cause, then to prove this cause by the same effects', is arguing in a circle; but he would not admit that it is circular to explain some effects by a cause, and then to prove that the cause by the same effects, 'for there is a great difference between proving and explaining'. Descartes points out that he used the word 'demonstration' ... to mean either one or the other 'in accordance with common usage, and not in the particular sense given to it by Philosophers'. Then he adds: 'it is not a circle to prove a cause by several effects which are known otherwise, then reciprocally to prove some other effects by this cause'.
