= Noël de Caron =

Noël de Caron (c. 1550 – 1 December 1624 ), Lord of Schoonewale, Flanders was a Dutch diplomat, who became a resident of London.

In 1612 King James I of England appointed Caron as Keeper of Bagshot Park in Surrey. He held the post until his death.

== Caron's Almshouses ==
Caron founded in London some almshouses in 1618 which provided accommodation for seven women over the age of 60. His will gave provision to pay these women's rent and a pension of 20 shillings per quarter.
