= The Search for Truth by Natural Light =

Philosophical dialogue by Descartes

The Search for Truth by Natural Light (La recherche de la vérité par la lumière naturelle) is an unfinished philosophical dialogue by René Descartes “set in the courtly culture of the ‘honnête homme’ and ‘curiosité’.” It was written in French (presumably after the Meditations was completed) but that was lost around 1700 and remained lost until a partial copy was discovered in Gottfried Wilhelm Leibniz's papers in Hanover in 1908 and published in the Adam-Tannery edition of Descartes's works and correspondence (vol. X, pp. 495-532). A Latin translation, Inquisitio Veritatis per Lumen Naturale, was published in 1683 as part of Renati Des-Cartes Musicae compendium (Blaviana printing house, Amsterdam) and again in 1701 as part of R. Des-Cartes Opuscula posthuma, physica et mathematica (Apud Janssonio-Waesbergios, Boom et Goethals, Amsterdam); it was also included in a Dutch translation of a collection of letters from Descartes published in 1684 by J.H. Glazemaker.

A definitive edition, containing the partial French text plus the fuller Dutch and Latin translations on facing pages was published in 2002. (Note: Erik Jan Bos, who prepared this collection, has argued that all three versions originated from a lost copy made by Ehrenfried Walther von Tschirnhaus.) The opening passage (translated by Norman Kemp Smith to English in 1957) "is a helpful commentary on the argument of Articles 74-78" of The Passions of the Soul.

== Descartes’s intent ==
Descartes begins by observing that "even though all the science that we can desire is to be found in books, what they contain of good is mixed with so many uselessness, and dispersed in the mass of so many large volumes, that for it would take longer to read than human life gives us, and to recognize what is useful in it, more talent than to find it ourselves." He therefore adds: "This is what makes me hope that the reader will not be sorry to find here a more abbreviated way, and that the truths which I will put forward will be acceptable to him, although I do not borrow them from Plato or Aristotle."

== The dialogue ==
Descartes then imagines a conversation between three characters: Eudoxus (Descartes's "mouthpiece"), Polyander and Epistemon. Eudoxus is a man endowed with an ordinary mind, but whose judgment is not spoiled by any false opinion, and who has all his reason intact, as he received it from nature; in his country house, where he lives, he receives a visit from two men of the greatest mind, and the most distinguished of the century, one of whom (Polyander) has never studied anything, while the other (Épistemon ) knows very well everything that can be learned in schools.

Eudoxus praises the merits of doubt: "Only pay me your attention; I will take you further than you think. Indeed, it is from this universal doubt that, as from a fixed and immutable point, I have resolved to derive the knowledge of God, of yourself, and of all that the world contains".

=== The cogito ===
Descartes provides, in this reply by Eudoxus to Epistemon, his only statement of the cogito per se, and admits that his insight is also expressible as dubito, ergo sum:

… [S]entio, oportere, ut quid dubitatio, quid cogitatio, quid exsistentia sit antè sciamus, quàm de veritate hujus ratiocinii : dubito, ergo sum, (Note: These phrases were italicized in the original.) vel, quod idem est, cogito, ergo sum : plane simus persuasi.

Translation:

… [I feel that] it is necessary to know what doubt is, and what thought is, [what existence is], before we can be fully persuaded of this reasoning — I doubt, therefore I am — or what is the same — I think, therefore I am: Let us be completely convinced. (Note: Translation by Hallam, with additions for completeness.)

== See also ==
- Cartesian doubt
- Cogito, ergo sum
