= Cartesian Self =

Part of a thought experiment

The Cartesian Self or Cartesian subject is a philosophical concept developed by French philosopher René Descartes within his system of mind–body dualism, is the term provided for a separation between mind and body as posited by Descartes. In the simple view the self can be viewed as just the mind which is separate from the body as well as from the outside world. The simple self, the mind, also stands to be capable of thinking about itself and its existence. The self when seen as a compound is when it can be interpreted as being a whole human being – body and mind – with the body being an extension of the mind. It is distinct from the Cartesian other, anything other than the Cartesian self, yet the human-being version, union of body and mind, of the self is capable of interaction with the Cartesian Other through extension. According to Descartes, there is a divide intrinsic to consciousness such that one individual's self is the only thing one can know to certainly exist – since one is not capable of knowing whether other minds exist or are able to think.

The phrase "Cartesian Self" is a term coined retrospectively in response to Descartes's actual analysis of mind–body dualism and is never actually used by him in his own writings.

== Background ==
René Descartes, the namesake for the concept in itself, was a seventeenth-century philosopher heavily engaged in epistemology and metaphysics who was interested with the nature of the self, which eventually lead to him pondering the concept a great deal. The beginnings of the idea for the Cartesian self come directly from René Descartes's writings, more specifically the idea originated from his book Meditations on First Philosophy. Descartes provided his explanation of the self primarily by going through a series of conceptions and constantly testing the validity of these same conceptions with a great deal of Philosophical skepticism. Descartes comes to the Dream argument within the Meditations to push forward the idea that our general senses were not to be trusted and could easily mislead us. The skepticism employed by Descartes in the Meditations leads to the rejection of nearly everything he had come to believe up until that point aside from one point which becomes the keystone for the idea of the Cartesian self.

After his rejection of all knowledge, Descartes famously concluded the statement Cogito ergo sum ('I think, therefore I am'), then through the use of his wax argument he is able to show how the physical is separate from innate qualities in relation to all things including the mind and body. The Cartesian Self, he concluded, is thus almost entirely self-evident since it would be contradictory to deny the existence of your mind through the use of your mind. Due to the thoughts Descartes had come to it he found humans are able to only truly know the self yet we can not actually know anything of the Cartesian other. The nature of the self was specifically addressed in the Second Meditation wherein the narrator stated: "I am, then, in the strict sense only a thing that thinks; that is, I am a mind, or intelligence, or reason – words whose meaning I have been ignorant of until now."

The mind and body aspects of Cartesian are distinct from one another. In the Sixth meditation Descartes goes on to describe how the mind and body stand to be distinct from one another primarily due to the fact that the mind is indivisible whereas the body is divisible. Although the mind and body remain distinct from one another the union of them can still be considered to be the Cartesian self Descartes claims in his sixth meditation further how we are not merely just a soul using a body since he has made the distinction between the mind and body while also proving that the mind and body form a union. Descartes explains that the mind interacts with the body through extension in a way similar to how gravity interacts with a stone.

It is based on the whole of the Cartesian Pure Inquirer, where cognitive capabilities and methods of achieving knowledge are alike to all knowers. However, the "knower" (particularly to Descartes) is treated as a featureless abstract, and not an actual person.

== Interpretations ==
According to Galen Strawson, the Cartesian self is pure individual consciousness and it was likened to the entity that Hume sought in the flux of perceptions, the Kantian "I think" or the pure formal unity, and Wittgenstein's conception of the subject not as part of the world but its limit.
