= Clinical equipoise =

Principle of medical research in clinical trials

Clinical equipoise, also known as the principle of equipoise, provides the ethical basis for medical research that involves assigning patients to different treatment arms of a clinical trial. The term was proposed by Benjamin Freedman in 1987 in response to "controversy in the clinical community" to define an ethical situation of “genuine uncertainty within the expert medical community… about the preferred treatment.” This applies also for off-label treatments performed before or during their required clinical trials.

An ethical dilemma arises in a clinical trial when the investigator(s) begin to believe that the treatment or intervention administered in one arm of the trial is significantly outperforming the other arms. A trial should begin with a null hypothesis, and there should exist no decisive evidence that the intervention or drug being tested will be superior to existing treatments, or that it will be completely ineffective. As the trial progresses, the findings may provide sufficient evidence to convince the investigator of the intervention or drug's efficacy. Once a certain threshold of evidence is passed, there is no longer genuine uncertainty about the most beneficial treatment, so there is an ethical imperative for the investigator to provide the superior intervention to all participants. Ethicists contest the location of this evidentiary threshold, with some suggesting that investigators should only continue the study until they are convinced that one of the treatments is better, and with others arguing that the study should continue until the evidence convinces the entire expert medical community.

The extent to which major research ethics policies endorse clinical equipoise varies. For instance, Canada's Canadian Tri-Council Policy Statement endorses it, whereas the International Council for Harmonisation (ICH) does not. With regard to clinical equipoise in practice, there is evidence that industry-funded studies disproportionately favor the industry product (74% industry product vs 26% standard of care, versus 47% and 53% for therapies tested by governmental or other non-profit organisations), suggesting unfavorable conditions for clinical equipoise. In contrast, a series of studies of national cancer institute funded trials suggests an outcome pattern consistent with clinical equipoise.

== History ==
Shaw and Chalmers argued early on that "If the clinician knows, or has good reason to believe, that a new therapy (A) is better than another therapy (B), he cannot participate in a comparative trial of Therapy A versus Therapy B. Ethically, the clinician is obligated to give Therapy A to each new patient with a need for one of these therapies." Researchers would thus face an ethical dilemma if they wanted to continue the study and collect more evidence, but had compelling evidence that one of the tested therapies was superior. They further stated that any results should be withheld from the researchers during the trial until completion to avoid this ethical dilemma and ensure the study’s completion.

This method proved to be difficult in modern research, where many clinical trials have to be performed and analyzed by experts in that field. Freedman proposed a different approach to this ethical dilemma called clinical equipoise. Clinical equipoise occurs "if there is genuine uncertainty within the expert medical community — not necessarily on the part of the individual investigator — about the preferred treatment." Clinical equipoise is distinguished from theoretical equipoise, which requires evidence on behalf of the alternative treatments to be exactly balanced and thus yields a very fragile epistemic threshold for favoring one treatment over the other. Theoretical equipoise could be disturbed, for example, by something as simple as anecdotal evidence or a hunch on the part of the investigator. Clinical equipoise allows investigators to continue a trial until they have enough statistical evidence to convince other experts of the validity of their results, without a loss of ethical integrity on the part of the investigators.

Equipoise is also an important consideration in the design of a trial from a patient’s perspective. This is especially true in randomized controlled trials (RCTs) for surgical interventions, where both trial and control arms are likely to have their own associated risks and hopes for benefits. The condition of the patient is also a factor in these risks. Ensuring that trials meet the standards of clinical equipoise is an important part of patient recruitment in this regard; it is likely that past trials that did not meet conditions of clinical equipoise suffered from poor recruitment.

== Criticism ==
Miller and Brody argue that the notion of clinical equipoise is fundamentally misguided. The ethics of therapy and the ethics of research are two distinct enterprises that are governed by different norms. They state, "The doctrine of clinical equipoise is intended to act as a bridge between therapy and research, allegedly making it possible to conduct RCTs without sacrificing the therapeutic obligation of physicians to provide treatment according to a scientifically validated standard of care. This constitutes therapeutic misconception concerning the ethics of clinical trials, analogous to the tendency of patient volunteers to confuse treatment in the context of RCTs with routine medical care." Equipoise, they argue, only makes sense as a normative assumption for clinical trials if one assumes that researchers have therapeutic obligations to their research participants. Further criticisms of clinical equipoise have been leveled by Robert Veatch and by Peter Ubel and Robert Silbergleit.

== See also ==
- Bracketing (phenomenology)
- Cartesian doubt
- Precautionary principle
- Principle of indifference
- Suspension of judgment
