= Gómez Pereira =

Spanish philosopher and doctor (1500–1567)

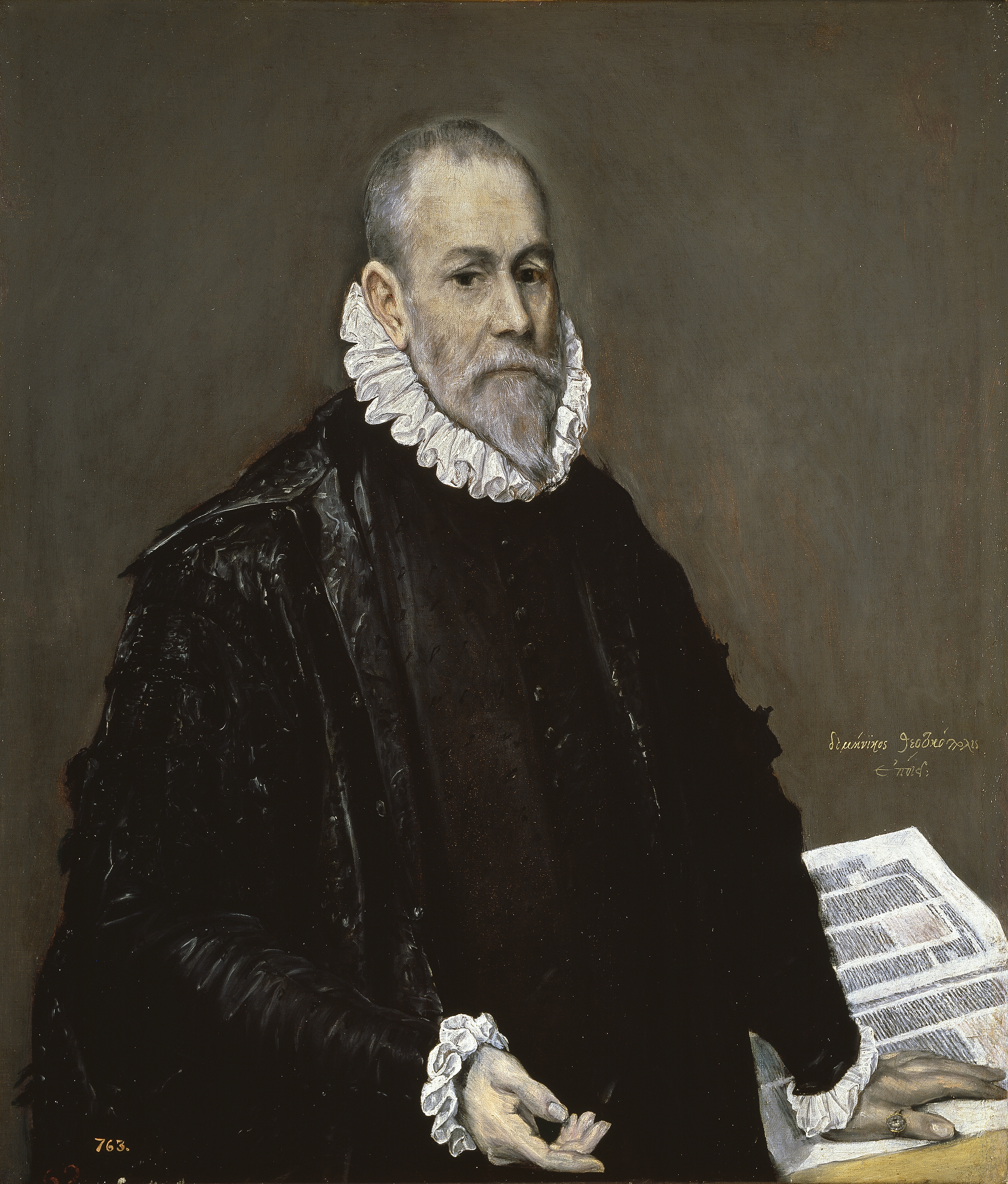
- Born: 1500; Medina del Campo, Crown of Castile
- Died: 1567 (aged 66–67)
- Occupations: Doctor, philosopher

Gómez Pereira (1500–1567) was a Spanish philosopher, doctor, and natural humanist from Medina del Campo. Pereira worked hard to dispel medieval concepts of medicine and proposed the application of empirical methods; as for his philosophy, it is of the standard direction and his reasonings are a clear precedent of René Descartes. He was the first to propose the famous "Cogito ergo sum", in 1554, commonly attributed to Descartes. He was famous for his practice of medicine, although he had many diverse occupations, such as owning businesses, engineering, and philosophy.

== Biography ==
Not much is known of his life, because there was no one who took care of his manuscripts. What is known is the result of the investigation of unrelated documents to which researchers have given shape, many of them having to do with business or lawsuits.

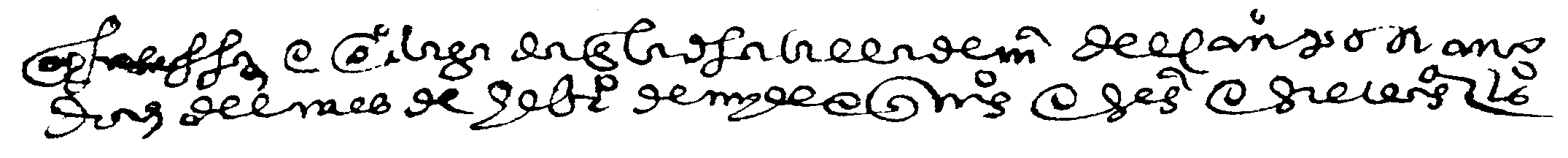
Notary document of 1567 with Pereira's signature

Born in 1500 in Medina del Campo, he was the second of five brothers; his father, Antonia Pereira, owned a small shop of xerguería, i.e., fabrics and low quality cloths. His mother, Margarita de Medina, died in 1515 and her sons went to the care of her aunt, Ana de Avila. It is thought that Pereira descended from a family of converted Jews originally from Portugal, though this is not certain because the source of this was a neighbor that testified against him in a lawsuit.

However, we cannot rule out this conversion because we know that, until his marriage, Pereira lived with his parents on Serrano street, which is located in the old Jewish quarter of town.

Pereira studied natural philosophy at the University of Salamanca with professor Juan Martínez Silíceo (who later became the archbishop of Toledo between 1545 and 1557). There, apparently, he was actively involved in the disputes between the realists and the nominalists, preferring the latter and rejecting the authority of the old masters in favor of knowledge provided by experience and reason. Here, he also studied medicine, concluding his studies 1520.

He then returned to Medina where he established himself as a doctor. He married Isabel Rodriguez and lived on Rúa Nueva (now Padilla Street) where he worked as a doctor and managed the business that he inherited from his family. He possessed a considerable amount of capital and invested in a wide range of business including responsibility for making the actual income and managing the collection of several parishes, trading and warehousing wines, and renting rooms to other merchants who went to the "Great Exhibitions of the Kingdom" that took place in Medina.

His fame as a physician exceeded the boundaries of Medina, and he practiced in Burgos, Segovia, Ávila and other important cities of Castille. He even came to the court of Phillip II where he was summed to attend upon Prince Charles, heir to the unfortunate throne, who had suffered a serious accident. Thanks to Pereira, the Prince lived until 1568. He was also interested in the construction of hydraulic devices and, with his companion Francisco Lobato, designed a watermill dam that could function without water, which was patented in 1563.

In folio 26 of the Manuscripts of Francisco Lobato, the Medinan engineer decided to design a special mill, at the initiative of King Maxmilian II of Austria, who at the time was in Valladolid (c. 1550), a refugee from the wars against the Protestants. The future king of Bohemia took a fancy to go up the Douro River, so he commanded a galley be built and ordered the removal of any building that disrupted his navigation, i.e., fisheries and mills. This greatly harmed the locals who came to Lobato and Pereira to design a mill that could grind with the force of water without being directly on the river bank. Lobato goes on to explain that a model they tested on the Zapardiel River "milled and shook with reasonable force ..., but it sucked in so much water that, by midday, there wasn't a single drop." Although the model was refined with a dam that returned the water to the river, the king paid no attention, and the project fell into oblivion. Lobato complained bitterly that, despite the promises of funding by the Habsburgs, "we have already spent 150 ducats ... and he never paid me anything—someday I'll have to ask for it."

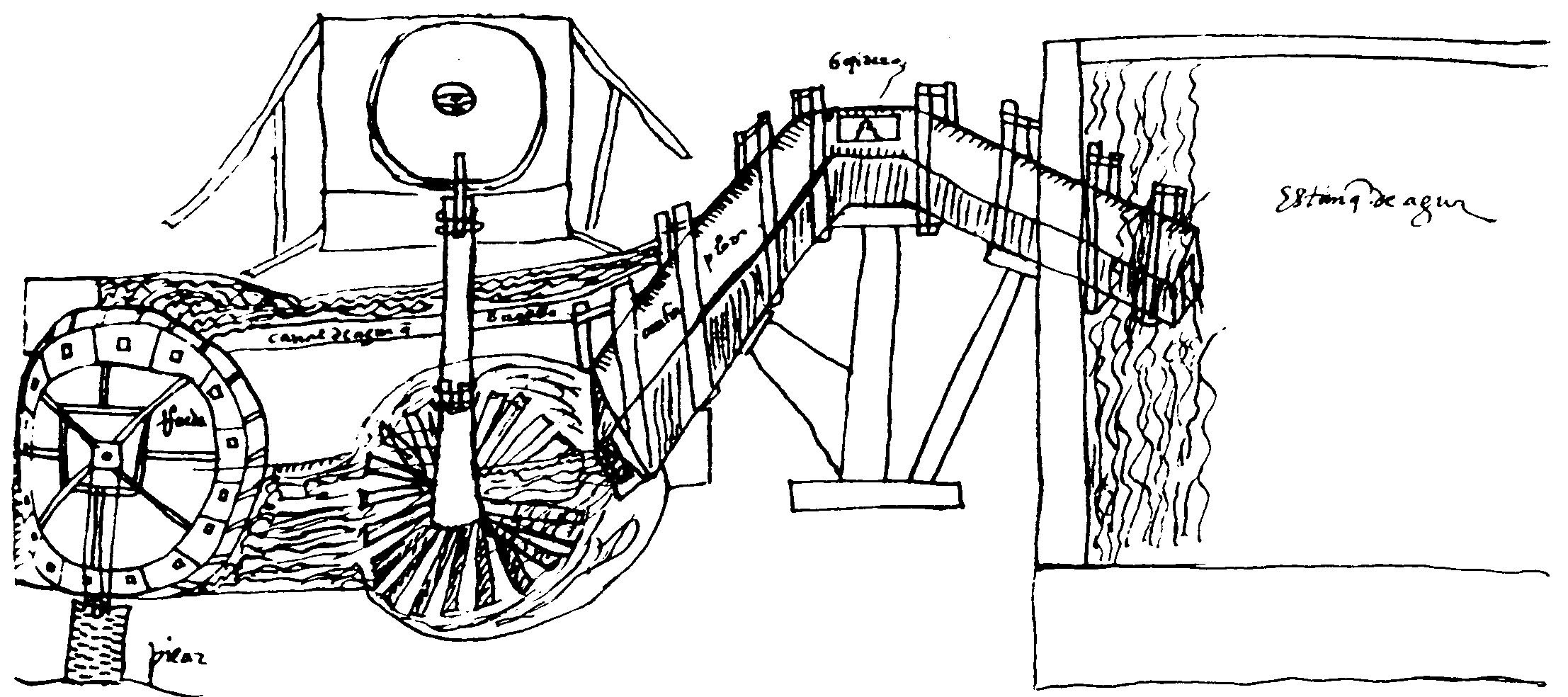
Siphoning mill of Francisco Lobato and Gómez Pereira

Pereira's unique thought arose from his synthesis of philosophy and medicine. He rejected the authority of the old masters and medievals in favor of reason, logic and experience. Moreover, he often used paradoxes and syllogisms to expose the errors of those he questioned. Thus, it can be argued that his philosophy was more negative than positive, but this is understandable considering the context of ideological suppression in the face of religious authority, as well the veiled accusations about Pereira's Jewish origins. The famous essayist Menéndez Pelayo wrote of this famous thinker:

In experimental psychology, Gómez Pereira is, without a doubt, more advanced than his time, more than the seventeenth century, more than Bacon, more than Descartes. None noted the phenomenon of his intelligence.

=== Novae veraeque Medicinae ===
Novae veraeque Medicinae is a medical treatise that focuses on the study of fevers [its causes and types] as well as other specific diseases like leprosy and smallpox. In this work, which he dedicated to Prince Don Carlos, Pereira challenges the tradition of Aristotle and Galen, as well as the medieval tradition of "magister dixit". His is an entirely empirical and rational method, based in his experience as a physician. The healing methods are simple, and the doctor, because of his method and experience, is the final criterion of truth (as opposed to truths of religion or faith). "In no case of religious things will I give the opinion and sentence of some philosopher if it is not based on reason."

Gómez Pereira felt that the heat generated by a fever is the body's defense mechanism to remove the damage that affects it and, thus, nature restores the natural balance of any body, a surprisingly modern conception of fever as a reaction against disease. As for his studies of diseases such as leprosy or smallpox, Pereira's conclusions were later commended by the physician and historian Antonio Hernández Morejón.

=== Antoniana Margarita ===
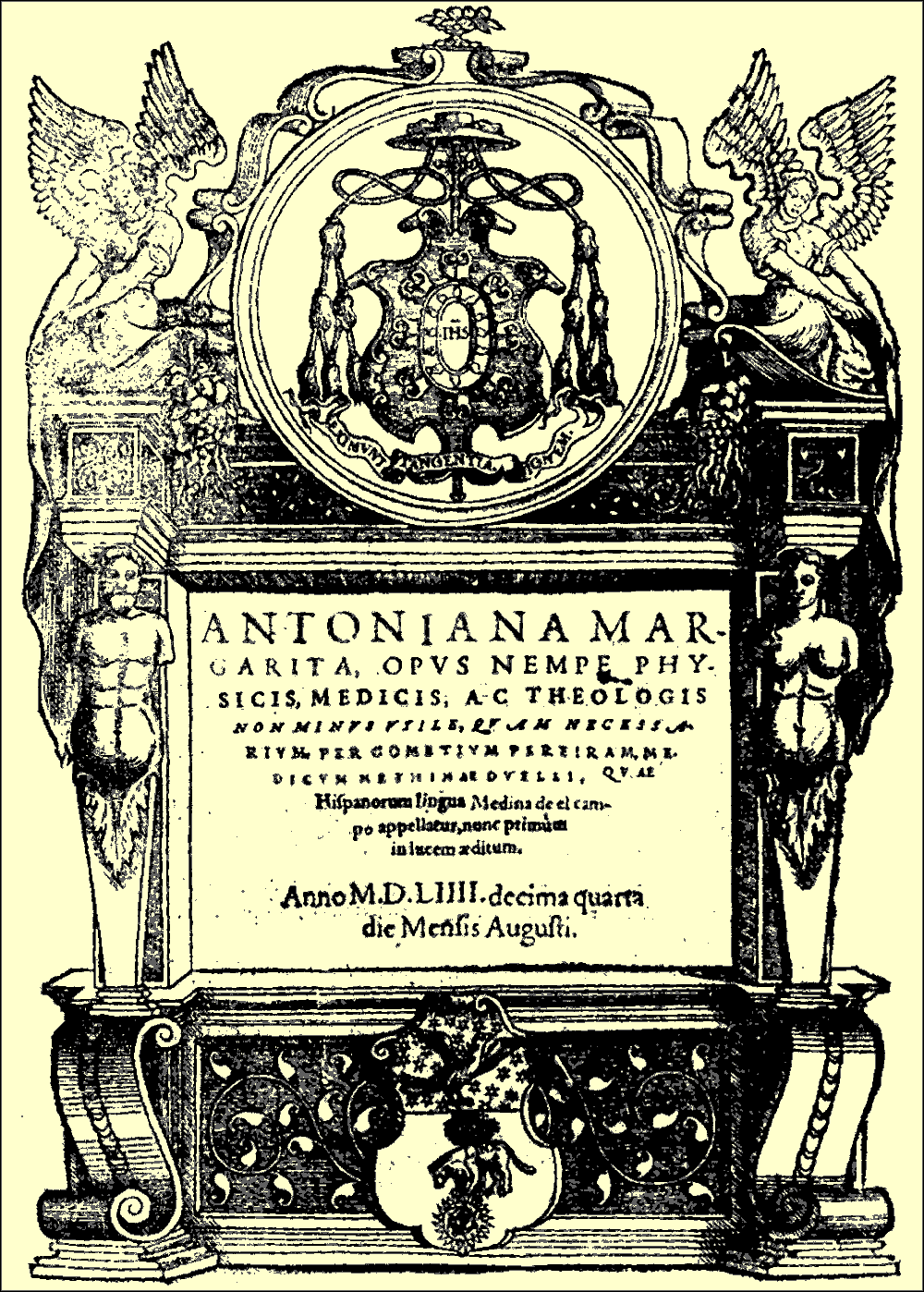
Antoniana Margarita

Antoniana Margarita was reprinted many times but only very recently translated into Spanish (2000, from the original Latin). The work is dedicated to his teacher Juan Martínez Siliceo and is a tribute to his parents, Antonio and Margarita, even though the subtitle of clearly indicates its scientific and philosophical contents: "a work so useful and necessary for medical, physical, and theologians ("Opus nempe phisicis, ac medicis teologis, non minus utile quam necessarium").

A difficult text to read because there are no chapters or paragraphs, the document uses the language of the "christianos nuevos" (New Christians) to explore new ideas from empiricism and materialism, possibly an effort to hide potentially controversial and blasphemous methods of reasoning (16th Century Castile, the Council of Trent had already begun). Thus, the Pereira did not venture to develop the logical conclusions to their fullest extent.

It is a philosophical treatise that addresses three key issues: the "automatism of beasts"; the theory of human knowledge; the immortality of the soul.

==== The insensibility of animals ====
Pereira's paradigm is typical of the Christian humanism of the Renaissance, denying that animals are equal to humans, while acknowledging some resemblance. Both have a body with five senses, but in the case of animals, the senses do not lead to knowledge, but cause automatic reactions. Indeed, many animals are capable of acting on internal impulses (soma), upon external stimuli (specie and phantasma), and have some non-conscious ability to learn (memoria). Nevertheless, Pereira denies animals the capacity for real knowledge: "bruta sensu carent".

The idea had many supporters, because, as indicated by the author himself, if animals feel just like humans, there would be nothing to differentiate, and if humans and animals are equal, animals can also learn about the Universal, which would be "absurd and impious." But he also had detractors, some of them very close. The physician Francisco de Sosa, who published in 1556 his work Endecálago against Antoniana Margarita, in which is treated many and very sensitive reasons and authorities of the proofs of the feeling and movement of brutes.

==== Human knowledge ====
In this sense, Pereira's ideas are radically opposed to medieval scholasticism. He argues that knowledge enters through the sensory organs, as in animals, but only the human soul, its spirit, is capable of converting the information provided by the senses into real thought. This is one of the qualities of the soul, the ability to extract from physical sensations the substance of things (universals) through this process of abstraction. But Gómez Pereira believes that sensation and intellect go together in such a way that in human beings there is something that identifies the faculty of feeling with the quality of thought, in the same way, e.g., that thought and language are linked: "if you feel, you understand."

==== The immortality of the soul ====
Thus, knowledge would be an essential faculty of the soul, and, moreover, the human being has a soul conscious of itself, that exists thanks to the thoughts it develops. In this work (Antoniana Margarita), there is the phrase "I know that I know something, anyone who knows exists, then I exist" ("Nosco me aliquid noscere, & quidquid noscit, est, ergo ego sum").

History has not recognized his contribution even though Descartes had already been accused of plagiarism in his time, for example by Pierre Daniel Huet.

Although Pereira recognizes that animals have souls, it dies with them. The human soul, however, is self-sufficient and thus immortal. He provides three proofs that he claims had not been discovered. First, because of its consciousness, the human soul is capable of knowing independent of the body, and thus is capable of existing despite the body's death. Secondly, the human soul does not change even though the body ages or becomes diseased, that is, its essence is not affected by extrinsic factors. Thirdly, it is the desire of all humans to attain happiness, which, alongside the wish to know the future and the consequences of our actions, are the reasons that prompt us to do good, because evil deeds lead to punishment and misfortune.

== Pereira and Descartes ==
After René Descartes published his Discourse on Method in 1637, the originality of the thoughts was questioned and even said to be an overt plagiarism of Gómez Pereira, as the Spanish philosopher had been studied by many prestigious intellectuals during the 16th and 17th Centuries.

The first to suggest the similarities between the two was Pierre Daniel Huet, originally a follower then an opponent of Cartesian philosophy. Descartes himself was forced to defend himself against these accusations, as is evidenced by a letter he wrote in 1641 to his friend Father Marin Mersenne:

I have not seen Antoniana Margarita, nor do I have a great need to see it any more than the Theses of Louvain or the book of Hansenius, but I would like to know where to find a copy if you think it necessary.

Many scholars of the 17th and 18th Centuries sided with Descartes and despised the work of Pereira, among them Pierre Bayle (although he did recognize the similarity between the two) and the Enclyopedists Diderot and d'Alembert who said:

Descartes is the first philosopher who dared to consider animals as mere machines: therefore, Gómez Pereira, who said this some time before him ... stumbled upon this hypothesis by chance.

However, many others have defended the contrary thesis. Even accepting that Descartes may not have read the work of Pereira, they argue that he was influenced indirectly, especially through the work of another Spanish physician and philosopher, Francisco Valles, who read it in French. Among those who accuse Descartes of being a counterfeit are Isaac Cardoso and Voltaire.

The basis for this criticism is the striking similarities between the two thinkers on some key points:

1. The empirical method: Descartes's is a priori and deductive, whereas Pereira's is a posteriori and inductive.
2. Souls of animals: for both, it is a material soul, limited and mortal
3. The "automatism of beasts": whereas Descartes says that animals have a body, mind and memory, Pereira says the same using different language, viz., animals have internal structure or soma, external stimuli or phantasmae, and the ability to learn or memoria.
4. The basic syllogism is strikingly similar in both, the "{{langrlink|la|Cogito ergo sum" ("je pense, donc je suis") of Descartes versus the "quidquid noscit, est, ergo ego sum" of Pereira (which precedes Descartes by some one hundred years).
