= Evil demon =

Concept in Cartesian philosophy

The evil demon, also known as Deus deceptor, malicious demon, and evil genius, is an epistemological concept that features prominently in Cartesian philosophy. In his Meditations on First Philosophy, René Descartes imagines that a malevolent God or an evil demon, of "utmost power and cunning has employed all his energies in order to deceive me". This malevolent God or evil demon is imagined to present a complete illusion of an external world, so that Descartes can say, "I shall think that the sky, the air, the earth, colours, shapes, sounds and all external things are merely the delusions of dreams which he has devised to ensnare my judgement. I shall consider myself as not having hands or eyes, or flesh, or blood or senses, but as falsely believing that I have all these things."

Some Cartesian scholars opine that the malevolent God or evil demon is also omnipotent, and thus capable of altering mathematics and the fundamentals of logic, though omnipotence of the malevolent God or evil demon would be contrary to Descartes's hypothesis, as he rebuked accusations of the evil demon having omnipotence. It is one of several methods of systematic doubt that Descartes employs in the Meditations.

== In context ==
Prior to the Meditations proper, Descartes gives a synopsis of each Meditation and says of Meditation One that "reasons are provided which give us possible grounds for doubt about all things, especially material things" and that whilst the usefulness of such extensive doubt may not be immediately apparent, "its greatest benefit lies in

- freeing us from all our preconceived opinions, and
- providing the easiest route by which the mind may be led away from the senses.

The eventual result of this doubt is to

- make it impossible for us to have any further doubts about what we subsequently discover to be true."

Descartes offers some standard reasons for doubting the reliability of the senses culminating in the dream argument and then extends this with the deceiving God argument. Descartes refers to "the long-standing opinion that there is an omnipotent God who made me the kind of creature that I am" and suggests that this God may have "brought it about that there is no earth, no sky, no extended thing, no shape, no size, no place, while at the same time ensuring that all these things appear to me to exist just as they do now". Furthermore, this God may have "brought it about that I too go wrong every time I add two and three or count the sides of a square, or in some even simpler matter, if that is imaginable".

After the deceiving God argument Descartes concludes that he is "compelled to admit that there is not one of my former beliefs about which a doubt may not properly be raised".

It is only after arriving at this conclusion that Descartes introduces the evil demon.

Although Descartes has provided arguments for doubting all his former beliefs he notes that "my habitual opinions keep coming back". It is to deal with this problem that Descartes decides he must do more than just acknowledge that the beliefs are open to doubt and must deceive himself, "by pretending for a time that these former opinions are utterly false and imaginary" and that he shall do this "until the weight of preconceived opinion is counter-balanced and the distorting influence of habit no longer prevents my judgement from perceiving things correctly".

It is to achieve this state of denial that Descartes says he will suppose that "some malicious demon of the utmost power and cunning has employed all his energies in order to deceive me".

The evil demon is also mentioned at the beginning of Meditation Two. Descartes says that if there is "a deceiver of supreme power and cunning who is deliberately and constantly deceiving me" then he himself must undoubtedly exist for the deceiver can "never bring it about that I am nothing so long as I think that I am something". A little later he says, "But what shall I now say that I am, when I am supposing that there is some supremely powerful and, if it is permissible to say so, malicious deceiver, who is deliberately trying to trick me in every way he can?"

== The deceiving god ==
Some writers, e.g. Bernard Williams and Alan Musgrave, make no distinction between the deceiving God and evil demon arguments and regard anything said about the deceiving God as being equivalent to saying something about the evil demon.

Other writers acknowledge that Descartes makes mention of both but then claim they are 'epistemologically equivalent'. Anthony Kenny says, "the two hypotheses do not differ in any respect of epistemological importance ... The content of the two hypotheses is the same ..." Lex Newman says, "Descartes's official position is that the Evil Genius Doubt is merely one among multiple hypotheses that can motivate the more general hyperbolic doubt ... Even so, I regularly speak in terms of the evil genius ... as a kind of mnemonic for the more general doubt about our cognitive nature."

If they are epistemologically equivalent, then the question arises as to why Descartes temporarily shifted from the deceiving God to the evil demon. It is tempting to think it is because there is a relevant theological difference. In Meditation Three, Descartes is going to establish not only that there is a God but that God is not a deceiver. When Descartes first introduces the evil demon he says, "I will suppose therefore that not God, who is supremely good and the source of truth, but rather some malicious demon, had employed his whole energies in deceiving me." Kenny says, "The hypothesis of the evil genius is substituted for that of the deceitful God simply because it is less offensive and less patently incoherent." However, at least in Meditation One, Descartes doesn't have a problem in postulating a deceiving God and he rejects the objection that such deception is inconsistent with God's supreme goodness. He says, "if it were inconsistent with his goodness to have created me such that I am deceived all the time, it would seem equally foreign to his goodness to allow me to be deceived even occasionally; yet this last assertion cannot be made." This is consistent with what he writes in the Principles where he says, "we have been told that God who created us can do all that he desires, and we do not yet know whether he may not have willed to create us in such a way that we shall always be deceived even in the things that we think ourselves to know best."

Other writers insist that it is important to maintain the distinction between the deceiving God and the evil demon. Gouhier (quoted by Kenny) argues that the deceiving God is an intellectual scruple that will disappear when metaphysics demonstrates its falsity whilst the evil demon is a methodological procedure designed to make a certain experiment and it ceases with that experiment. He says, "Neither the purpose nor the content of the two hypotheses allow us to regard the one as a variant of the other."

Vendler argues that literary form of the Meditations is heavily influenced by St. Ignatius of Loyola's Spiritual Exercises to which Descartes will have been exposed during his training at the Jesuit college of La Fleche. As such, "The demon in the First Meditation is not evoked to serve as an epistomological menace, but as a psychological device: following Loyola's advice age contra! ('go against!'), it provides a counterweight to our inordinate inclination to trust the senses." He adds, "the 'demon-argument' is not an argument at all. Descartes does not need another argument at this stage: the dream argument has already shown the unreliability of the senses and the deceiver-God argument the uncertainty of mathematics. For one thing, the demon does not even touch mathematics or geometry. Why should he? He is evoked by Descartes to cure his inordinate attachment to the senses; he does not complain (and would not) of a similar attachment to mathematics or geometry." Hatfield takes a similar line saying, "Descartes adopts a common practice from the spiritual exercises upon which his metaphysical meditations are modelled, devising a program for training the will to keep the old beliefs at bay" adding, "It seems likely that he chose to call his hypothetical deceiver a "malicious demon" in order to avoid having the meditator concentrate extensively on the thought that God could be a deceiver, a proposition he considered false and one he intended to refute later."

== Omnipotence ==
Among the accusations of blasphemy made against Descartes by Protestants was that he was positing an omnipotent malevolent God. Voetius accused Descartes of blasphemy in 1643. Jacques Triglandius and Jacobus Revius, theologians at Leiden University, made similar accusations in 1647, accusing Descartes of "hold[ing] God to be a deceiver", a position that they stated to be "contrary to the glory of God". Descartes was threatened with having his views condemned by a synod, but this was prevented by the intercession of the Prince of Orange (at the request of the French Ambassador Servien).

The accusations referenced a passage in the First Meditation where Descartes stated that he supposed not an optimal God but rather an evil demon "summe potens & callidus" ('most highly powerful and cunning'). The accusers identified Descartes's concept of a deus deceptor with his concept of an evil demon, stating that only an omnipotent God is "summe potens" and that describing the evil demon as such thus demonstrated the identity. Descartes's response to the accusations was that in that passage he had been expressly distinguishing between "the supremely good God, the source of truth, on the one hand, and the malicious demon on the other". He did not directly rebut the charge of implying that the evil demon was omnipotent, but asserted that simply describing something with "some attribute that in reality belongs only to God" does not mean that that something is being held to actually be a supreme God.

According to Janowski, "The alleged distinction between the respective powers of God and the evil genius that escaped the attention of the two theologians also escaped the attention of a host of distinguished Cartesian scholars (Alquié, Beck, Brehier, Chevalier, Frankfurt, Gilson, Kenny, Laporte, Kemp-Smith, Wilson), who, only seldom interested in interpreting Descartes's philosophy through the prism of doctrinal orthodoxy, also insist on the omnipotence of the evil genius." He further claims that the reason for this is that there is progression through the First Meditation, leading to the introduction of the concept of the evil genius "which crowns the process begun at the outset of the Meditations."

However, it is not quite so straightforward. For example, Wilson notes that "Gouhier has shown, the hypothesis of the malign spirit takes over from that of the Deceiving God from the end of the First Meditation to the beginning of the Third – where the latter figure is resubstituted without comment or explanation. As Gouhier has also noted, the summary of 'doubts' in the concluding passage ... does not include mention of mathematical propositions – which are not again brought into discussion until the Third Meditation." She adds in the accompanying footnote that, even if one has to concede that the text does not reveal any sharp distinction between the power hypothetically ascribed to the 'malignant spirit' and that genuinely attributable to God, "Gouhier's observation is essentially accurate, and useful in understanding the rhetoric and organization of the first three Meditations. It may also have some deeper significance, because of the association – ... of the possibility of deception in mathematics with the doctrine of the creation of the eternal truths."

Similarly, Kenny who does say that the evil genius is substituted for that of the deceitful God "simply because it is less offensive and less patently incoherent", for "The content of the two hypotheses is the same, namely that an omnipotent deceiver is trying to deceive", goes on to note that, "If the two hypotheses differ at all, it is the first that is more skeptical than the second. God ... may have made him go wrong in mathematics – ... the evil genius merely reinforces the doubt that the external world may be a dream." When Kenny says that the evil genius is simply a substitute for the deceitful God, he is not trying to establish that, therefore, the evil genius was omnipotent, instead he is challenging the view that the evil genius somehow progressed on from God and is rejecting the view that "the evil genius is to serve a more radically skeptical purpose than the hypothesis of the deceitful God."

According to Janowski, the fact that the demon is not said to challenge mathematics, implies either that the evil demon is not omnipotent or that Descartes retracted Universal Doubt. Janowski notes that in the Principles of Philosophy (I, 15) Descartes states that Universal Doubt applies even to "the demonstration of mathematics", and so concludes that either Descartes's Meditation is flawed, lacking a reason for doubting mathematics, or that the charges of blasphemy were well placed, and Descartes was supposing an omnipotent evil demon.

However, this is only a problem if one assumes that Descartes was withdrawing the notion of a deceitful God and replacing it with the evil demon. More recent commentators take the argument to have reached its conclusion with the deceitful God. When Descartes says, "I will suppose therefore that not God, who is supremely good and the source of truth, but rather some malicious demon ..." he is not rejecting the notion of a deceitful God on the grounds that God is not a deceiver for this is something he is not entitled to rely on, because, as he says at the beginning of Meditation three, he doesn't "yet even know for sure whether there is a God at all". Instead, he is introducing an aid to the meditator who finds that, despite the arguments presented, "habitual opinions keep coming back". Kenny says, "The purpose of taking seriously the hypothesis of the evil genius is to counterbalance natural credulity and keep in mind the doubts raised by the supposition of the deceitful God." When the role of the demon is understood this way the issue of the demon's omnipotence becomes unimportant.

== Brain in a vat ==
In 1968, James Cornman and Keith Lehrer suggested something they called the braino machine that "operates by influencing the brain of a subject who wears a special cap, called a 'braino cap'. When the braino cap is placed on a subject's head, the operator of the braino can affect his brain so as to produce any hallucination in the subject that the operator wishes. The braino is a hallucination-producing machine. The hallucinations produced by it may be as complete, systematic, and coherent as the operator of the braino desires to make them." The braino argument was intended to show that, even if it is sometimes possible for a person to tell if they are hallucinating, it is not possible for them to know that they are not hallucinating. If the braino is operated by an evil being, whom Cornman and Lehrer call Dr. O, then it would be possible for Dr. O to create in a person experiences that are identical to the ones of the supposed real world. If that were the case, then the experiences thus created would not constitute knowledge, for the source of those experiences would be the machine and not the world. However, since the fake and the real would be hypothetically indistinguishable, it follows that the current supposed experiences of the real world are also insufficient to generate knowledge. This proof by contradiction that the real world cannot generate knowledge, and thus that the fake imitation world cannot generate knowledge either, is one proposed way of disproving the Brain in a Vat argument.

In 1973, in the introduction to his book Thought, Gilbert Harman said, "it might be suggested that you have not the slightest reason to believe that you are in the surroundings you suppose you are in ... various hypotheses could explain how things look and feel. You might be sound asleep and dreaming or a playful brain surgeon might be giving you these experiences by stimulating your cortex in a special way. You might really be stretched out on a table in his laboratory with wires running into your head from a large computer. Perhaps you have always been on that table. Perhaps you are quite a different person from what you seem ..."

Such scenarios had been used many times in science fiction but in philosophy it is now routine to refer to being like a 'brain in a vat' after Hilary Putnam produced an argument which, ironically, purported to show that "the supposition that we are actually brains in a vat, although it violates no physical law, and is perfectly consistent with everything we have experienced, cannot possibly be true. It cannot possibly be true, because it is, in a certain way, self-refuting."

Putnam's argument notwithstanding, the brain in a vat scenario is usually presented as a sceptical argument and in many ways equivalent to Descartes's deceiving God and evil demon.

One crucial difference that prevents such scenarios being a direct substitute for the deceiving God and evil demon is that they generally presuppose that we have heads or bodies whereas it is important for Descartes to argue that he can doubt the existence of his body and that he can only be sure he is a 'thinking thing'. Harman's version of the story does, however, add the final thought that having a brain "might be just part of the myth you are being given".

== See also ==
- Allegory of the cave
- Boltzmann brain
- Cogito ergo sum
- Demiurge
- Dream argument
- Experience machine
- Internalism and externalism
- Simulated reality
- Simulation hypothesis
- Skeptical hypothesis
- The Imaginary (Sartre)
