= Suspension of judgment =

Cognitive process of withholding judgment

Suspended judgment is a cognitive process and a rational state of mind in which one withholds judgments, particularly on the drawing of moral or ethical conclusions. The opposite of suspension of judgment is premature judgement, usually shortened to prejudice. While prejudgment involves drawing a conclusion or making a judgment before having the information relevant to such a judgment, suspension of judgment involves waiting for all the facts before making a decision.

== Law ==
Suspension of judgment is used in civil law to indicate a court's decision to nullify a civil judgment. Motions to set aside judgments entered in civil cases in the United States district courts are governed by Rule 60 of the Federal Rules of Civil Procedure which opens with the statement, "On motion and just terms, the court may relieve a party or its legal representative from a final judgment, order, or proceeding...". The rule is quite straightforward and court room application is mostly as stated. In the New York Law Journal David Bliven argues that suspended judgement ought to be an alternative disposition in family offenses (a type of civil case), particularly in cases where a family judgement is being used as behavior modification rather than a reason to arrest.

More generally in jurisprudence, the ideal juror is expected to presume innocence of the person tried in court. And in the case of conviction, a suspended sentence is one of the possible sentences available to the court.

== Science ==
Suspension of judgment is a cornerstone of standard research methodology. Much of the scientific method is designed to encourage the suspension of judgments until observations can be made, tested, and verified through peer review. In 1877, Charles Sanders Peirce characterized inquiry in general not as the pursuit of truth per se but as the struggle to move from irritating, inhibitory doubts born of surprises, disagreements, and the like, and to reach a secure belief, belief being that on which one is prepared to act. He framed scientific inquiry as part of a broader spectrum and as spurred, like inquiry generally, by actual doubt, not mere verbal or hyperbolic doubt, which he held to be fruitless. He believed that the scientific method excels the other methods of reasoning by being designed to eventually arrive at the most secure beliefs. Starting from the idea that people seek not truth per se but instead to subdue irritating, inhibitory doubt, Peirce showed how, through the struggle, some can come to submit to truth for the sake of belief's integrity, seek as truth the guidance of potential practice correctly to its given goal, and wed themselves to the scientific method.

The advance of social science often depends on excluding cognitive bias, of which many forms are known.

== Philosophy ==
Within philosophy, suspension of judgment is typically associated with positivism and skepticism, most especially Pyrrhonism where it is referred to as epoché, but it is not limited to these areas. The 17th century rationalist René Descartes, for example, used it as the cornerstone of his epistemology. In a process that he called methodological skepticism (now also known as Cartesian doubt), he asserted that in order to gain a solid foundation when building one's system of knowledge and belief, one must first doubt everything. Only by eliminating preconceptions and prejudgments can one come to know what is true.

Descartes's methodology is called hyperbolic doubt because it is an extreme form of doubt, casting even slightly suspect into the light of further scrutiny. Hyperbolic doubt is posited in four general points:

1. Only information that you know to be true should be accepted.
2. Take known truths and break them down into their basic components.
3. Solve the simplest problems first.
4. Take the remaining problems and make complete lists of them.

Descartes goal in the 1641 Meditations on First Philosophy was to systematically doubt all beliefs and do a ground-up rebuild of only definitely true things as an undoubted basis for the sciences. As an example take a look at the opening line of the volume:

Several years have now elapsed since I first became aware that I had accepted, even from my youth, many false opinions for true, and that consequently what I afterward based on such principles was highly doubtful; and from that time I was convinced of the necessity of undertaking once in my life to rid myself of all the opinions I had adopted, and of commencing anew the work of building from the foundation...

— René Descartes, Meditation I, 1641

Through this work Descartes showed that unless one is very careful there are grounds to doubt the reasoning behind any knowledge. He states that this is mostly due to the unreliable nature of sensory knowledge and makes that case with the examples of the dream and the demon.

=== The dream argument ===
Descartes hypothesized that due to the possibility of very realistic dreams humans can only believe that we're awake. Through the systematic procedure of 'phenomenological reduction', one is thought to be able to suspend judgment regarding the general or naive philosophical belief in the existence of the external world, and thus examine phenomena as they are originally given to consciousness. However, by the end of The Meditations, he concludes that in retrospect we can certainly distinguish dreaming and reality:

But when I distinctly see where things come from and where and when they come to me, and when I can connect my perceptions of them with my whole life without a break then I can be certain that when I encounter these things I am not asleep but awake.

— Descartes, Descartes: Selected Philosophical Writings

Dreaming is also a starting position for the speculation that we may be living in a simulation. Proponents of this viewpoint will sometimes argue that a particular type of simulated reality occurs nightly. The basic claim is that opponents of the simulation hypothesis that a sleeping mind is an unreliable mechanism for differentiated reality from illusion.

=== The Evil Demon ===
The idea of the "evil demon" (also known as the "malicious demon") or "evil genius" is one of several methods of systematic doubt employed in the Meditations. Descartes reasoned that it could be possible for what he referred to as an evil demon to be controlling our experiences. There are some Cartesian scholars whom opine that the demon is omnipotent though omnipotence of the evil demon would be contrary to Descartes's hypothesis, as he rebuked accusations of the demon having omnipotence.

=== Contemporary Analytic Philosophy ===
Suspension of judgment is also discussed as an epistemic attitude within contemporary analytic philosophy. To suspend belief in this sense requires more than a mere lack of belief and disbelief. Ralph Wedgwood offers a propositional attitude account of the suspension of judgment in his essay "The Aim of Belief", namely the attitude of suspending judgment about the truth of a proposition. In her article "Why Suspend Judging?", Jane Friedman argues against propositional attitude accounts. She instead identifies the suspension of judgment as a "question-directed attitude" that involves inquiry. She writes,

The thought that suspending [judgment] might involve inquiring can sound dramatic, but I don’t think it’s meant to imply that anyone who suspends must be like the detective in active pursuit of the suspect, rather that the state of mind one is in when one suspends judgment involves a kind of openness and sensitivity to certain kinds of information that makes it that it is well described as an inquiring state of mind.

== See also ==
- Agnosticism
- Bracketing
- Suspension of disbelief
