= Cogito, ergo sum =

Phrase of the philosopher René Descartes

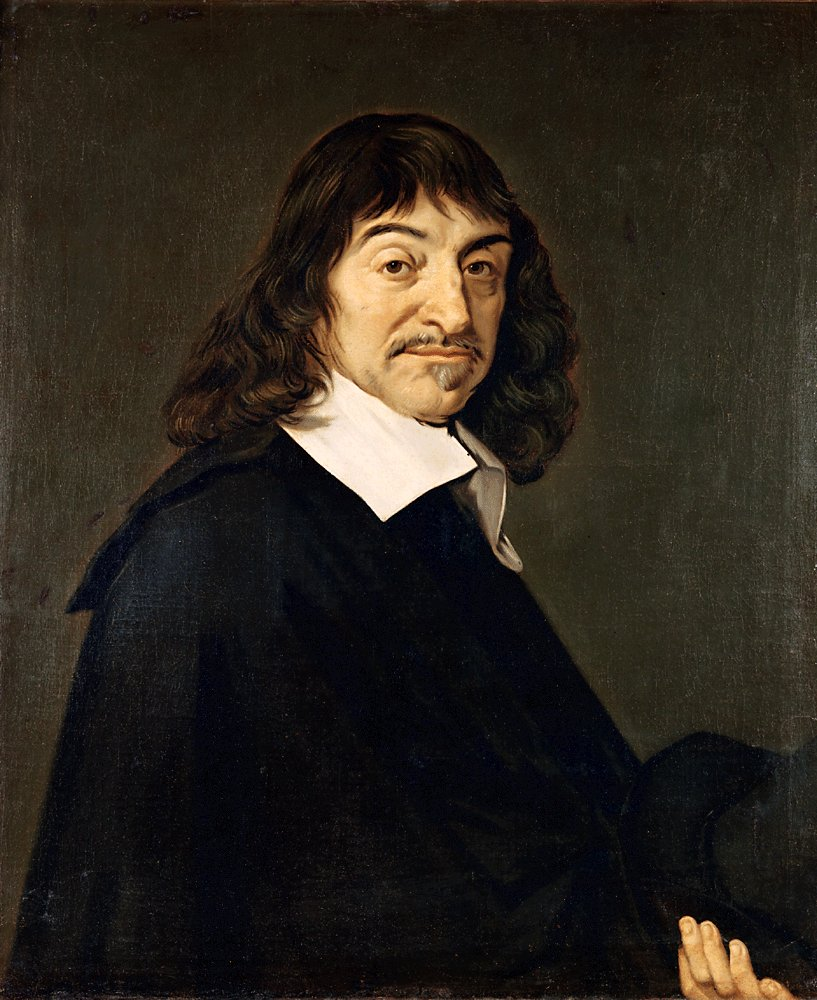
René Descartes, who published the phrase in Discourse on the Method, in 1637

The Latin cogito, ergo sum, usually translated into English as "I think, therefore I am", (Note: Some sources offer "I am thinking, therefore I am" or "I think, therefore I exist" as better translations. (See § Translation.)) is the "first principle" of the philosophy of the French scientist and philosopher René Descartes. He originally published it in French as je pense, donc je suis in his 1637 Discourse on the Method, so as to reach a wider audience than Latin would have allowed. It later appeared in Latin in his Principles of Philosophy, and a similar phrase (ego sum, ego existo, 'I am, I exist') also featured prominently in his Meditations on First Philosophy. The dictum is also sometimes referred to as the cogito. As Descartes explained in a margin note, "we cannot doubt of our existence while we doubt." In the posthumously published The Search for Truth by Natural Light, he expanded it to dubito, ergo sum, vel, quod idem est, cogito, ergo sum ("I doubt, therefore I am—or what is the same—I think, therefore I am."). Antoine Léonard Thomas, in a 1765 essay in honor of Descartes, wrote in summary: dubito, ergo cogito, ergo sum ("I doubt, therefore I think, therefore I am."). (Note: This expression is often mistakenly attributed to Descartes. (See Other forms.))

Descartes's statement became a fundamental element of Western philosophy, as it purported to provide a certain foundation for knowledge in the face of radical doubt. While other knowledge could be a figment of imagination, deception, or mistake, Descartes asserted that the very act of doubting one's own existence served—at minimum—as proof of the reality of one's own mind; there must be a thinking entity—in this case the self—for there to be a thought.

One critique of the dictum, first suggested by Pierre Gassendi, is that it presupposes that there is an "I" which must be doing the thinking. According to this line of criticism, the most that Descartes was entitled to say was that "thinking is occurring", not that "I am thinking".

== In Descartes's writings ==
Descartes first wrote the phrase in French in his 1637 Discourse on the Method. He referred to it in Latin without explicitly stating the familiar form of the phrase in his 1641 Meditations on First Philosophy. The earliest written record of the phrase in Latin is in his 1644 Principles of Philosophy, where, in a margin note (see below), he provides a clear explanation of his intent: "[W]e cannot doubt of our existence while we doubt". Fuller forms of the phrase are attributable to other authors.

=== Discourse on the Method ===
The phrase first appeared (in French) in Descartes's 1637 Discourse on the Method in the first paragraph of its fourth part:

Ainsi, à cause que nos sens nous trompent quelquefois, je voulus supposer qu'il n'y avait aucune chose qui fût telle qu'ils nous la font imaginer; Et parce qu'il y a des hommes qui se méprennent en raisonnant, même touchant les plus simples matières de Géométrie, et y font des Paralogismes, jugeant que j'étais sujet à faillir autant qu'aucun autre, je rejetai comme fausses toutes les raisons que j'avais prises auparavant pour Démonstrations; Et enfin, considérant que toutes les mêmes pensées que nous avons étant éveillés nous peuvent aussi venir quand nous dormons, sans qu'il y en ait aucune raison pour lors qui soit vraie, je me résolus de feindre que toutes les choses qui m'étaient jamais entrées en l'esprit n'étaient non plus vraies que les illusions de mes songes. Mais aussitôt après je pris garde que, pendant que je voulais ainsi penser que tout était faux, il fallait nécessairement que moi qui le pensais fusse quelque chose; Et remarquant que cette vérité, je pense, donc je suis, (Note: Cogito variant highlighted to facilitate comparison; the phrase was italicized in the original.) était si ferme et si assurée, que toutes les plus extravagantes suppositions des Sceptiques n'étaient pas capables de l'ébranler, je jugeai que je pouvais la recevoir sans scrupule pour le premier principe de la Philosophie que je cherchais. (Note: Capitalization as in original; spelling updated from Middle French to Modern French.) (Note: See original Discours manuscript here.)

Translation:

Accordingly, seeing that our senses sometimes deceive us, I was willing to suppose that there existed nothing really such as they presented to us; And because some men err in reasoning, and fall into Paralogisms, even on the simplest matters of Geometry, I, convinced that I was as open to error as any other, rejected as false all the reasonings I had hitherto taken for Demonstrations; And finally, when I considered that the very same thoughts (presentations) which we experience when awake may also be experienced when we are asleep, while there is at that time not one of them true, I supposed that all the objects (presentations) that had ever entered into my mind when awake, had in them no more truth than the illusions of my dreams. But immediately upon this I observed that, whilst I thus wished to think that all was false, it was absolutely necessary that I, who thus thought, should be something; And as I observed that this truth, I think, therefore I am, was so certain and of such evidence that no ground of doubt, however extravagant, could be alleged by the Sceptics capable of shaking it, I concluded that I might, without scruple, accept it as the first principle of the philosophy of which I was in search. (Note: This translation, by Veitch in 1850, is modified here as follows: Veitch's "I think, hence I am" is changed to the form by which it is currently best known in English, "I think, therefore I am", which appeared in the Haldane and Ross 1911 translation, and as an isolated attributed phrase previously, e.g., in Sullivan (1794); in the preceding line, Veitch's "I, who thus thought, should be somewhat" is given here as "… should be something" for clarity (in accord with other translations, e.g., that of Cress); and capitalization was reverted to conform to Descartes's original in French.) (Note: The 1637 Discours was translated to Latin in the 1644 Specimina Philosophiae but this is not referenced here because of issues raised regarding translation quality.)

=== Meditations on First Philosophy ===
In 1641, Descartes published (in Latin) Meditations on first philosophy in which he referred to the proposition, though not explicitly as "cogito, ergo sum" in Meditation II:

hoc pronuntiatum: Ego sum, Ego existo, (Note: Cogito variant highlighted to facilitate comparison; capitalization as in original.) quoties a me profertur, vel mente concipitur, necessario esse verum.

Translation:

this proposition: I am, I exist, whenever it is uttered by me, or conceived by the mind, necessarily is true. (Note: This combines, for clarity and to retain phrase ordering, the Cress and Haldane translations.) (Note: Jaako Hintikka comments that ego sum, ego existo is the simplest example of an "existentially self-verifying" sentence, i.e., one whose negation verifies itself "when … expressly uttered or otherwise professed"; and that ego sum is an alternative to cogito, ergo sum to express "the existential inconsistency of the sentence 'I don't exist' and the existential self-verifiability of 'I exist'".)

In Response to an Objection from Marin Mersenne, he wrote "cogito, ergo sum” in an extended form and, again, prefaced with ‘ego’:

Cum advertimus nos esse res cogitantes, prima quædam notio est quæ ex nullo syllogismo concluditur; neque etiam cum quis dicit ‘ego cogito, ergo sum, sive existo,’ existentiam ex cogitatione per syllogismum deducit, sed tanquam rem per se notam simplici mentis intuitu agnoscit.

Translation:

And when we become aware that we are thinking things, this is a primary notion which is not derived by means of any syllogism. When someone says 'I am thinking, therefore I am, or I exist’ he does not deduce existence from thought by means of a syllogism, but recognizes it as something self-evident by a simple intuition of the mind.

=== Principles of Philosophy ===
In 1644, Descartes published (in Latin) his Principles of Philosophy which begins Veritatem inquirenti semel in vita da omnibus, quantum fieri potest, esse dubitandum. (That in order to seek truth, it is necessary once in the course of our life, to doubt, as far as possible, of all things. (Note: Translation from The Principles of Philosophy at Project Gutenberg.)) The phrase "ego cogito, ergo sum" appears in Part 1, article 7:

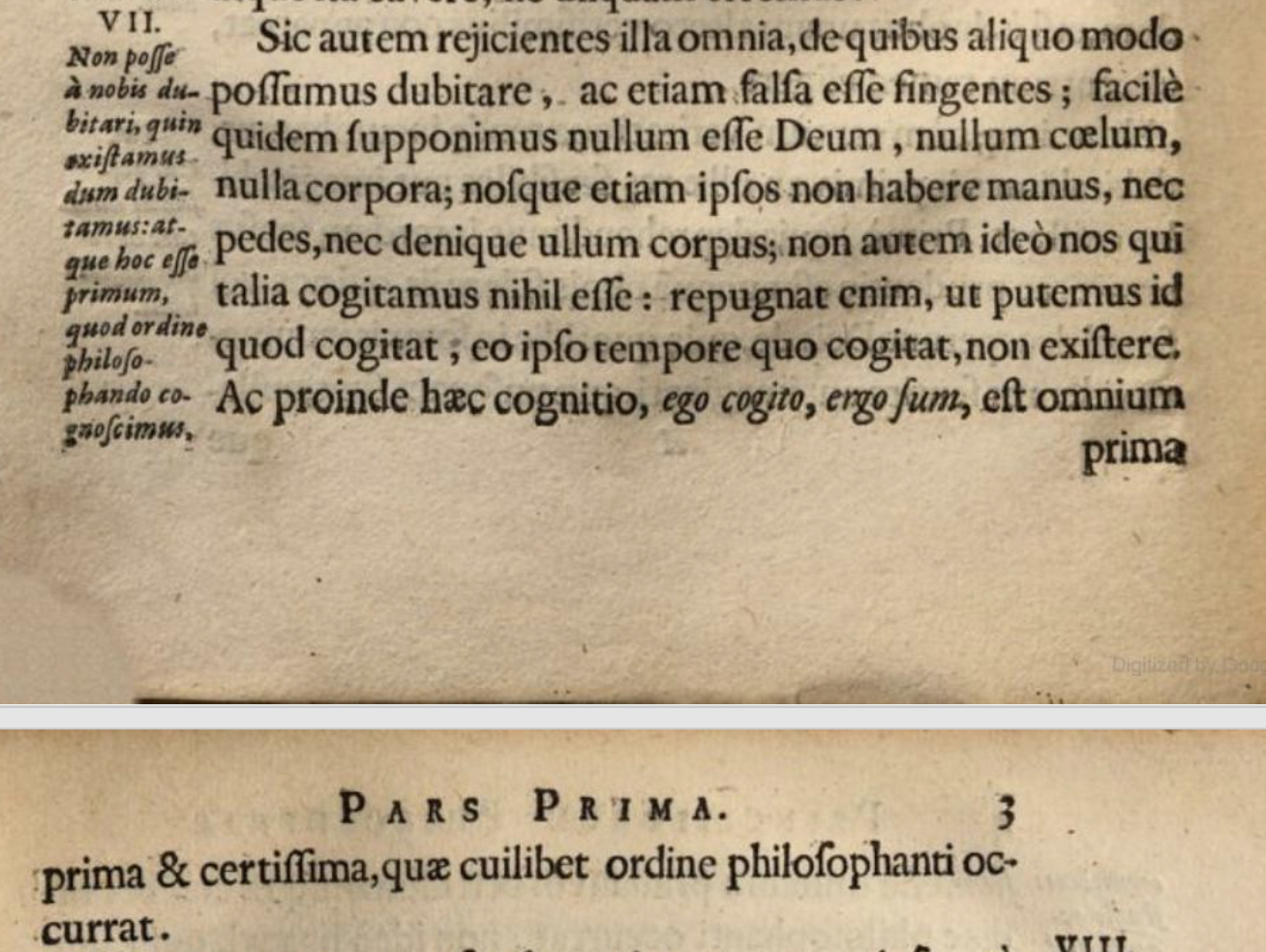
"ego cogito, ergo sum" with margin note in original (1644) Principia Philosophae

Sic autem rejicientes illa omnia, de quibus aliquo modo possumus dubitare, ac etiam, falsa esse fingentes, facilè quidem, supponimus nullum esse Deum, nullum coelum, nulla corpora; nosque etiam ipsos, non habere manus, nec pedes, nec denique ullum corpus, non autem ideò nos qui talia cogitamus nihil esse: repugnat enim ut putemus id quod cogitat eo ipso tempore quo cogitat non existere. Ac proinde haec cognitio, ego cogito, ergo sum, est omnium prima & certissima, quae cuilibet ordine philosophanti occurrat. (Note: See original Principia manuscript here.)

Translation:

While we thus reject all of which we can entertain the smallest doubt, and even imagine that it is false, we easily indeed suppose that there is neither God, nor sky, nor bodies, and that we ourselves even have neither hands nor feet, nor, finally, a body; but we cannot in the same way suppose that we are not while we doubt of the truth of these things; for there is a repugnance in conceiving that what thinks does not exist at the very time when it thinks. Accordingly, the knowledge, (Note: A 1647 French translation, published with Descartes's enthusiastic approval, substituted 'conclusion' for 'knowledge'.) I think, therefore I am, is the first and most certain that occurs to one who philosophizes orderly.

Descartes's margin note for the above paragraph is:

Non posse à nobis dubitari, quin existamus dum dubitamus; atque hoc esse primum, quod ordine philosophando cognoscimus.

Translation:

That we cannot doubt of our existence while we doubt, and that this is the first knowledge we acquire when we philosophize in order.

=== The Search for Truth by Natural Light ===
Descartes, in a lesser-known posthumously published work written ca. 1647, originally in French with the title La Recherche de la Vérité par La Lumiere Naturale (The Search for Truth by Natural Light) and later in Latin with the title Inquisitio Veritatis per Lumen Naturale, provides his only known phrasing of the cogito as cogito, ergo sum (without a leading ego) and admits that his insight is also expressible as dubito, ergo sum:

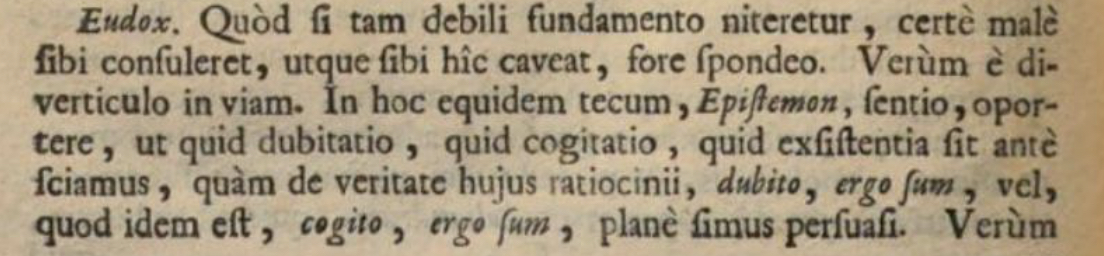
"dubito, ergo sum, vel, quod idem est, cogito, ergo sum" in Inquisitio Veritatis per Lumen Naturale

... [S]entio, oportere, ut quid dubitatio, quid cogitatio, quid exsistentia sit antè sciamus, quàm de veritate hujus ratiocinii: dubito, ergo sum, vel, quod idem est, cogito, ergo sum : plane simus persuasi.

Translation:

… [I feel that] it is necessary to know what doubt is, and what thought is, [what existence is], before we can be fully persuaded of this reasoning — I doubt, therefore I am — or what is the same — I think, therefore I am. (Note: Translation by Hallam, with additions for completeness.)

=== "ego cogito, ergo sum" or "cogito, ergo sum"? ===
Peter J. Markie notes: "Descartes stresses the first person in his premise twice in the Principles and once in his Reply to Mersenne. ego cogito, ergo sum . . . . (AT VIII, 7; AT VIII, 8; AT VII, 140)" and adds "It is unlikely that Descartes would stress the first person in his premise, if he wanted us to read the premise as 'Thought is taking place' rather than 'I think.'" Gary Hatfield writes: "[I]n Latin the first-person voice need not be expressed through a separate pronoun, but may be included in the verb form; nonetheless, Descartes used the Latin first-person pronoun ego more than thirty times in the six Meditations."

=== Other forms ===
The proposition is sometimes given as dubito, ergo cogito, ergo sum. This form was penned by the French literary critic, Antoine Léonard Thomas, (Note: Thomas was known in his time for his great eloquence especially for éloges in praise of past luminaries.) in an award-winning 1765 essay in praise of Descartes, where it appeared as "Puisque je doute, je pense; puisque je pense, j'existe" ('Since I doubt, I think; since I think, I exist'). With rearrangement and compaction, the passage translates to "I doubt, therefore I think, therefore I am," or in Latin, "dubito, ergo cogito, ergo sum." (Note: The 1765 work, Éloge de René Descartes, by Antoine Léonard Thomas, was awarded the 1765 Le Prix De L'académie Française and republished in the 1826 compilation of Descartes's work, Oeuvres de Descartes by Victor Cousin. The French text is available in more accessible format at Project Gutenberg. The compilation by Cousin is credited with a revival of interest in Descartes.) This aptly captures Descartes's intent as expressed in his posthumously published La Recherche de la Vérité par La Lumiere Naturale as noted above: I doubt, therefore I am – or what is the same – I think, therefore I am.

A further expansion, dubito, ergo cogito, ergo sum—res cogitans ("…—a thinking thing") extends the cogito with Descartes's statement in the subsequent Meditation, "Ego sum res cogitans, id est dubitans, affirmans, negans, pauca intelligens, multa ignorans, volens, nolens, imaginans etiam et sentiens…" ("I am a thinking [conscious] thing, that is, a being who doubts, affirms, denies, knows a few objects, and is ignorant of many, [who loves, hates,] (Note: the French adds "loves, hates"; hence Veitch's inclusion despite its absence from the Latin here. see Cottingham, J. (ed), 1986, "Meditations on First Philosophy, with selections from Objections and Replies", p.24fn1.) wills, refuses, who imagines likewise, and perceives"). (Note: This translation by Veitch is the first English translation from Descartes as "I am a thinking thing".) This has been referred to as "the expanded cogito." (Note: Martin Schoock, in the 1642–43 controversy between Descartes and Gisbertus Voetius, fiercely attacked Descartes and his philosophy in an essay. He wrote cogito, ergo sum, res cogitans and cogito, inquiro, dubito ergo sum as well as cogito, ergo sum (multiple times) in his 1652 De Scepticismo.)

== Translation ==
=== "I am thinking" vs. "I think" ===
While the Latin cōgitō may be translated rather easily as "I think/ponder/visualize", je pense does not indicate whether the verb form corresponds to the English present simple ("think") or progressive aspect ("is thinking"). Following John Lyons (1982), Vladimir Žegarac notes, "The temptation to use the present simple is said to arise from the lack of progressive forms in Latin and French, and from a misinterpretation of the meaning of cogito as habitual or generic" (cf. gnomic aspect). Also following Lyons, Ann Banfield writes, "In order for the statement on which Descartes's argument depends to represent certain knowledge,… its tense must be a true present—in English, a progressive,… not as 'I think' but as 'I am thinking, in conformity with the general translation of the Latin or French present tense in such nongeneric, nonstative contexts." Or in the words of Simon Blackburn, "Descartes's premise is not 'I think' in the sense of 'I ski', which can be true even if you are not at the moment skiing. It is supposed to be parallel to 'I am skiing'."

The similar translation "I am thinking, therefore I exist" of Descartes's correspondence in French ("je pense, donc je suis") appears in The Philosophical Writings of Descartes by Cottingham et al. (1988).

The earliest known translation as "I am thinking, therefore I am" is from 1872 by Charles Porterfield Krauth. (Note: Krauth is not explicitly acknowledged as author of this article, but is so identified the following year by Garretson.)

Fumitaka Suzuki writes "Taking consideration of Cartesian theory of continuous creation, which theory was developed especially in the Meditations and in the Principles, we would assure that 'I am thinking, therefore I am/exist' is the most appropriate English translation of 'ego cogito, ergo sum'."

=== "I exist" vs. "I am" ===
Alexis Deodato S. Itao notes that cogito, ergo sum is "literally 'I think, therefore I am'." Others differ: 1) "[A] precise English translation will read as 'I am thinking, therefore I exist'; and 2) "[S]ince Descartes ... emphasized that existence is such an important 'notion,' a better translation is 'I am thinking, therefore I exist.'"

=== Punctuation ===
As seen above, cogito, ergo sum always occurs in Descartes' writing mid-sentence, uncapitalized, and with a comma between cogito and ergo. Commas were not used in Classical Latin but were a regular feature of scholastic Latin, the Latin Descartes "had learned in a Jesuit college at La Flèche." Most modern reference works show it with a comma, but it is often presented without a comma in academic work and in popular usage.

== Interpretation ==
As put succinctly by Krauth (1872), "That cannot doubt which does not think, and that cannot think which does not exist. I doubt, I think, I exist."

The phrase cogito, ergo sum is not used in Descartes's Meditations on First Philosophy, but the term "the cogito" is used to refer to an argument from it. In the Meditations, Descartes phrases the conclusion of the argument as "that the proposition, I am, I exist, is necessarily true whenever it is put forward by me or conceived in my mind" (Meditation II). George Henry Lewes says Descartes "has told us that [his objective] was to find a starting point from which to reason—to find an irreversible certainty. And where did he find this? In his own consciousness. Doubt as I may, I cannot doubt of my own existence, because my very doubts reveal to me a something which doubts. You may call this an assumption, if you will; I point out the fact as one above and beyond all logic; which logic can neither prove nor disprove; but which must always remain an irreversible certainty, and as such a fitting basis of philosophy."

At the beginning of the second meditation, having reached what he considers to be the ultimate level of doubt—his argument from the existence of a deceiving god—Descartes examines his beliefs to see if any have survived the doubt. In his belief in his own existence, he finds that it is impossible to doubt that he exists. Even if there were a deceiving god (or an evil demon), one's belief in their own existence would be secure, for there is no way one could be deceived unless one existed in order to be deceived.

But I have convinced myself that there is absolutely nothing in the world, no sky, no earth, no minds, no bodies. Does it now follow that I, too, do not exist? No. If I convinced myself of something [or thought anything at all], then I certainly existed. But there is a deceiver of supreme power and cunning who deliberately and constantly deceives me. In that case, I, too, undoubtedly exist, if he deceives me; and let him deceive me as much as he can, he will never bring it about that I am nothing, so long as I think that I am something. So, after considering everything very thoroughly, I must finally conclude that the proposition, I am, I exist, is necessarily true whenever it is put forward by me or conceived in my mind. (AT VII 25; CSM II 16–17) (Note: AT refers to Adams and Tannery; CSM II to Cottingham, Stoothoff, and Murdoch; CSMK III to Cottingham, Stoothoff, Murdoch, and Kenny)

There are three important notes to keep in mind here. First, he claims only the certainty of his own existence from the first-person point of view — he has not proved the existence of other minds at this point. This is something that has to be thought through by each of us for ourselves, as we follow the course of the meditations. Second, he does not say that his existence is necessary; he says that if he thinks, then necessarily he exists (see the instantiation principle). Third, this proposition "I am, I exist" is held true not based on a deduction (as mentioned above) or on empirical induction but on the clarity and self-evidence of the proposition. Descartes does not use this first certainty, the cogito, as a foundation upon which to build further knowledge; rather, it is the firm ground upon which he can stand as he works to discover further truths. As he puts it:

Archimedes used to demand just one firm and immovable point in order to shift the entire earth; so I too can hope for great things if I manage to find just one thing, however slight, that is certain and unshakable. (AT VII 24; CSM II 16)

According to many Descartes specialists, including Étienne Gilson, the goal of Descartes in establishing this first truth is to demonstrate the capacity of his criterion — the immediate clarity and distinctiveness of self-evident propositions — to establish true and justified propositions despite having adopted a method of generalized doubt. As a consequence of this demonstration, Descartes considers science and mathematics to be justified to the extent that their proposals are established on a similarly immediate clarity, distinctiveness, and self-evidence that presents itself to the mind. The originality of Descartes's thinking, therefore, is not so much in expressing the cogito—a feat accomplished by other predecessors, as we shall see—but on using the cogito as demonstrating the most fundamental epistemological principle, that science and mathematics are justified by relying on clarity, distinctiveness, and self-evidence. Baruch Spinoza in "Principia philosophiae cartesianae" at its Prolegomenon identified "cogito ergo sum" the "ego sum cogitans" (I am a thinking being) as the thinking substance with his ontological interpretation.

== Predecessors ==
Although the idea expressed in cogito, ergo sum is widely attributed to Descartes, he was not the first to mention it. In the late sixth or early fifth century BC, Parmenides is quoted as saying "For to be aware and to be are the same". (Fragment B3) Plato spoke about the "knowledge of knowledge" (Greek: νόησις νοήσεως, nóesis noéseos) and Aristotle explained the idea saying "whenever we perceive, we are conscious that we perceive, and whenever we think, we are conscious that we think, and to be conscious that we are perceiving or thinking is to be conscious that we exist" (Nicomachean Ethics, 1170a 25 ff.)

The Cartesian statement was interpreted to be an Aristotelian syllogism where the premise that all thinkers are also beings is not made explicit.

In the early fifth century AD, Augustine of Hippo in De Civitate Dei (book XI, 26) affirmed his certain knowledge of his own existence, and added: "So far as these truths are concerned, I do not at all fear the arguments of the Academics when they say, What if you are mistaken? For if I am mistaken, I exist." (Note: Augustine makes a similar argument in the Enchiridion, ch. 7, sec. 20.) This formulation (si fallor, sum) is sometimes called the Augustinian cogito. In 1640, Descartes wrote to thank Andreas Colvius (a friend of Descartes's mentor, Isaac Beeckman) for drawing his attention to Augustine:

I am obliged to you for drawing my attention to the passage of St Augustine relevant to my I am thinking, therefore I exist. I went today to the library of this town to read it, and I do indeed find that he does use it to prove the certainty of our existence. He goes on to show that there is a certain likeness of the Trinity in us, in that we exist, we know that we exist, and we love the existence and the knowledge we have. I, on the other hand, use the argument to show that this I which is thinking is an immaterial substance with no bodily element. These are two very different things. In itself it is such a simple and natural thing to infer that one exists from the fact that one is doubting that it could have occurred to any writer. But I am very glad to find myself in agreement with St Augustine, if only to hush the little minds who have tried to find fault with the principle.

Another predecessor was Avicenna's "Floating Man" thought experiment on human self-awareness and self-consciousness.

The 8th century Hindu philosopher Adi Shankara wrote, in a similar fashion, that no one thinks 'I am not', arguing that one's existence cannot be doubted, as there must be someone there to doubt.

Spanish philosopher Gómez Pereira in his 1554 work Antoniana Margarita, wrote "nosco me aliquid noscere, & quidquid noscit, est, ergo ego sum" ('I know that I know something, anyone who knows is, therefore I am').

== Critique ==
=== Use of "I" ===
In Descartes, The Project of Pure Enquiry, English philosopher Bernard Williams provides a history and full evaluation of this issue. The first to raise the "I" problem was Pierre Gassendi, who in his Disquisitio Metaphysica, as noted by Saul Fisher, "points out that recognition that one has a set of thoughts does not imply that one is a particular thinker or another. …[T]he only claim that is indubitable here is the agent-independent claim that there is cognitive activity present."

The objection, as presented by Georg Lichtenberg, is that rather than supposing an entity that is thinking, Descartes should have said: "thinking is occurring." That is, whatever the force of the cogito, Descartes draws too much from it; the existence of a thinking thing, the reference of the "I," is more than the cogito can justify. Friedrich Nietzsche criticized the phrase in that it presupposes that there is an "I", that there is such an activity as "thinking", and that "I" know what "thinking" is. He suggested a more appropriate phrase would be "it thinks" wherein the "it" could be an impersonal subject as in the sentence "It is raining."

=== Søren Kierkegaard ===
The Danish philosopher Søren Kierkegaard called the phrase a tautology in his Concluding Unscientific Postscript. He argues that the cogito already presupposes the existence of "I", and therefore concluding with existence is logically trivial. Kierkegaard's argument can be made clearer if one extracts the premise "I think" into the premises "'x' thinks" and "I am that 'x'", where "x" is used as a placeholder in order to disambiguate the "I" from the thinking thing.

Here, the cogito has already assumed the "I"'s existence as that which thinks. For Kierkegaard, Descartes is merely "developing the content of a concept", namely that the "I", which already exists, thinks. As Kierkegaard argues, the proper logical flow of argument is that existence is already assumed or presupposed in order for thinking to occur, not that existence is concluded from that thinking. He writes, "If the I in cogito is understood to be an individual human being, then the statement demonstrates nothing: I am thinking ergo I am, but if I am thinking, no wonder, then, that I am; after all, it has already been said, and the first [sentence] consequently says even more than the last."

=== Bernard Williams ===
Williams himself claimed that what we are dealing with when we talk of thought, or when we say "I am thinking," is something conceivable from a third-person perspective—namely objective "thought-events" in the former case, and an objective thinker in the latter. He argues, first, that it is impossible to make sense of "there is thinking" without relativizing it to something. However, this something cannot be Cartesian egos, because it is impossible to differentiate objectively between things just on the basis of the pure content of consciousness. The obvious problem is that, through introspection, or our experience of consciousness, we have no way of moving to conclude the existence of any third-personal fact, to conceive of which would require something above and beyond just the purely subjective contents of the mind.

=== Martin Heidegger ===
As a critic of Cartesian subjectivity, German philosopher Martin Heidegger sought to ground human subjectivity in death as that certainty which individualizes and authenticates our Being (Dasein). As he wrote in 1925 in History of the Concept of Time:

This certainty, that "I myself am, in that I will die," is the basic certainty of Dasein itself. It is a genuine statement of Dasein, while cogito sum is only the semblance of such a statement. If such pointed formulations mean anything at all, then the appropriate statement pertaining to Dasein in its being would have to be sum moribundus [I am in dying], moribundus not as someone gravely ill or wounded, but insofar as I am, I am moribundus. The MORIBUNDUS first gives the SUM its sense.

=== John Macmurray ===
The Scottish philosopher John Macmurray rejected the cogito outright in order to place action at the center of a philosophical system he entitled the Form of the Personal. "We must reject this, both as standpoint and as method. If this be philosophy, then philosophy is a bubble floating in an atmosphere of unreality." The reliance on thought creates an irreconcilable dualism between thought and action in which the unity of experience is lost, thus dissolving the integrity of our selves and destroying any connection with reality. In order to formulate a more adequate cogito, Macmurray proposes the substitution of "I do" for "I think," ultimately leading to a belief in God as an agent to whom all persons stand in relation.

=== Alfred North Whitehead ===
In Process and Reality, Whitehead wrote "Descartes in his own philosophy conceives the thinker as creating the occasional thought. The philosophy of organism inverts the order, and conceives the thought as a constituent operation in the creation of the occasional thinker. The thinker is the final end whereby there is the thought. In this inversion we have the final contrast between a philosophy of substance and a philosophy of organism."

== In popular culture ==
In the short story, I Have No Mouth, and I Must Scream, by Harlan Ellison, Gorrister, when asked what 'AM' means, says "At first it meant Allied Mastercomputer, and then it meant Adaptive Manipulator, and later on it developed sentience and linked itself up and they called it an Aggressive Menace, but by then it was too late, and finally called itself AM, emerging intelligence, and what it meant was I am ... cogito ergo sum ... I think, therefore I am."

In the Japanese animated television series Ergo Proxy, a computer virus known as the Cogito virus begins infecting the autoreivs, the series' version of robots. The virus is named such due to the fact that it makes the infected conscious and causes them to experience emotions as a human would.

In Monty Python's Bruces' Philosophers Song, one of the lyrics jokingly quotes Descartes's axiom as "I drink therefore I am."

In the episode "Work Experience" of The Office, David Brent says, "We are the most efficient branch, cogito ergo sum, we'll be fine."

In the video game Honkai: Star Rail, Dr. Ratio (real name Veritas Ratio), a playable character and, according to in-game lore, a philosopher, has a skill, named "Cogito, Ergo Sum".

== See also ==
- Academic skepticism – Skeptical period of ancient Academy
- Apperception – Several aspects of perception and consciousness
- Be, and it is – Phrase that occurs eight times in the Quran
- Brain in a vat – Philosophical thought experiment
- Cartesian doubt – Form of methodological skepticism
- Floating man – Thought experiment by Ibn Sina
- I Am that I Am – English translation of a Hebrew Biblical phrase
- Tat Tvam Asi – "You are that"
- The Animal That Therefore I Am – Book by Jacques Derrida
- Vertiginous question – Philosophical question about personal identity
- I have no mouth and I must scream – 1967 short story by Harlan Ellison
