= Antoine-Léonard Thomas =

French poet and literary critic (1732–1785)

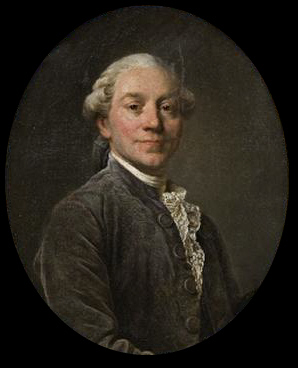
DUPLESSIS Joseph Siffred: Portrait d'Antoine-Léonard Thomas

Antoine Léonard Thomas (1 October 1732 – 17 September 1785) was a French poet and literary critic, best known in his time for his great eloquence, especially for éloges in praise of past luminaries. It was in recognition of this that he was elected to the Académie Française.

In an award-winning 1765 essay in praise of René Descartes, he penned a fuller form of the cogito in French as "Puisque je doute, je pense; puisque je pense, j'existe". With rearrangement and compaction, the passage translates to 'I doubt, therefore I think, therefore I am', or in Latin, "dubito, ergo cogito, ergo sum". (Note: This 1765 work, Éloge de René Descartes, was awarded the 1765 Le Prix De L'académie Française. (The French text is available in more accessible format at Project Gutenberg.) Victor Cousin republished the Éloge in his 1826 compilation of Descartes's work, Oeuvres de Descartes which has since been credited with a revival of interest in Descartes.)

He was born in Clermont-Ferrand and died aged 52 in Oullins.

== Works ==
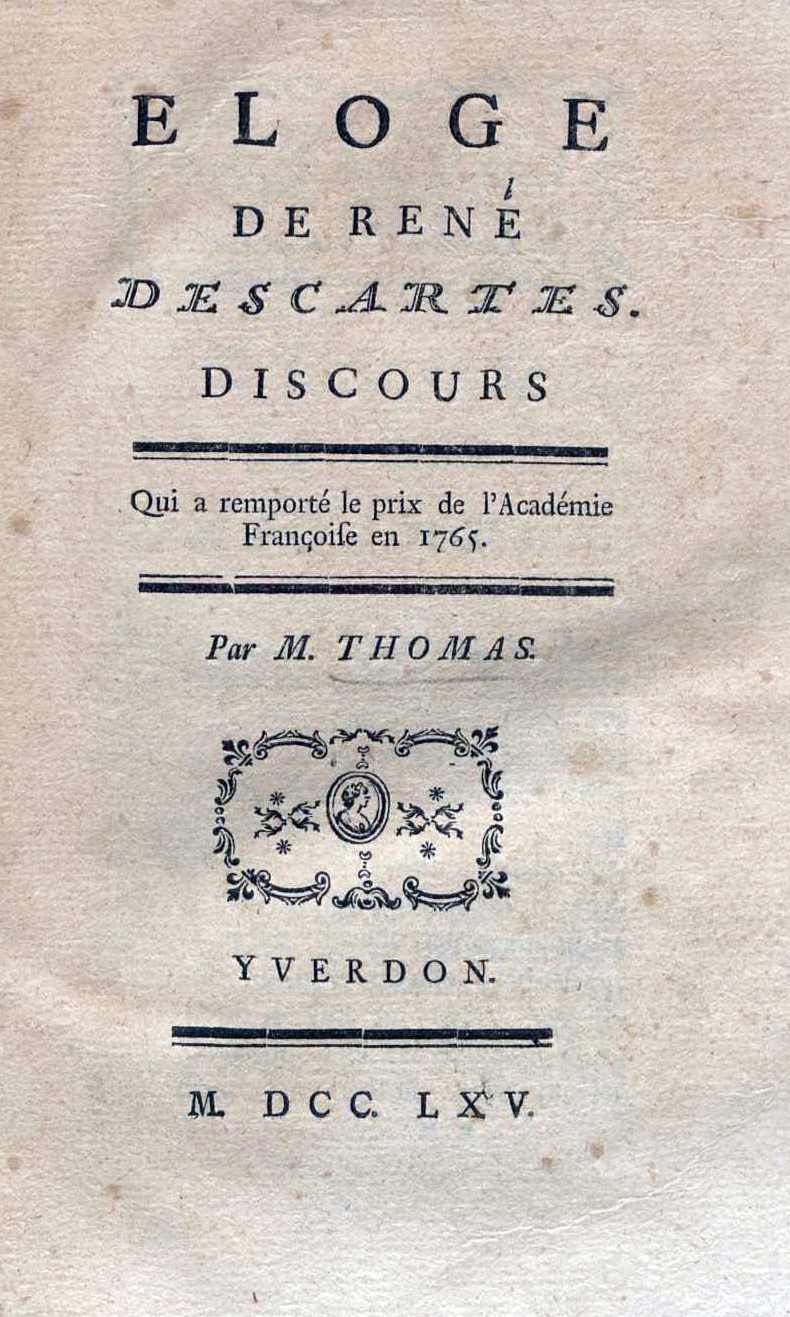
Éloge de René Descartes (1765)

- Eloge de René Descartes (in French). Yverdon. 1765.
