= Dream argument =

Postulation about the act of dreaming

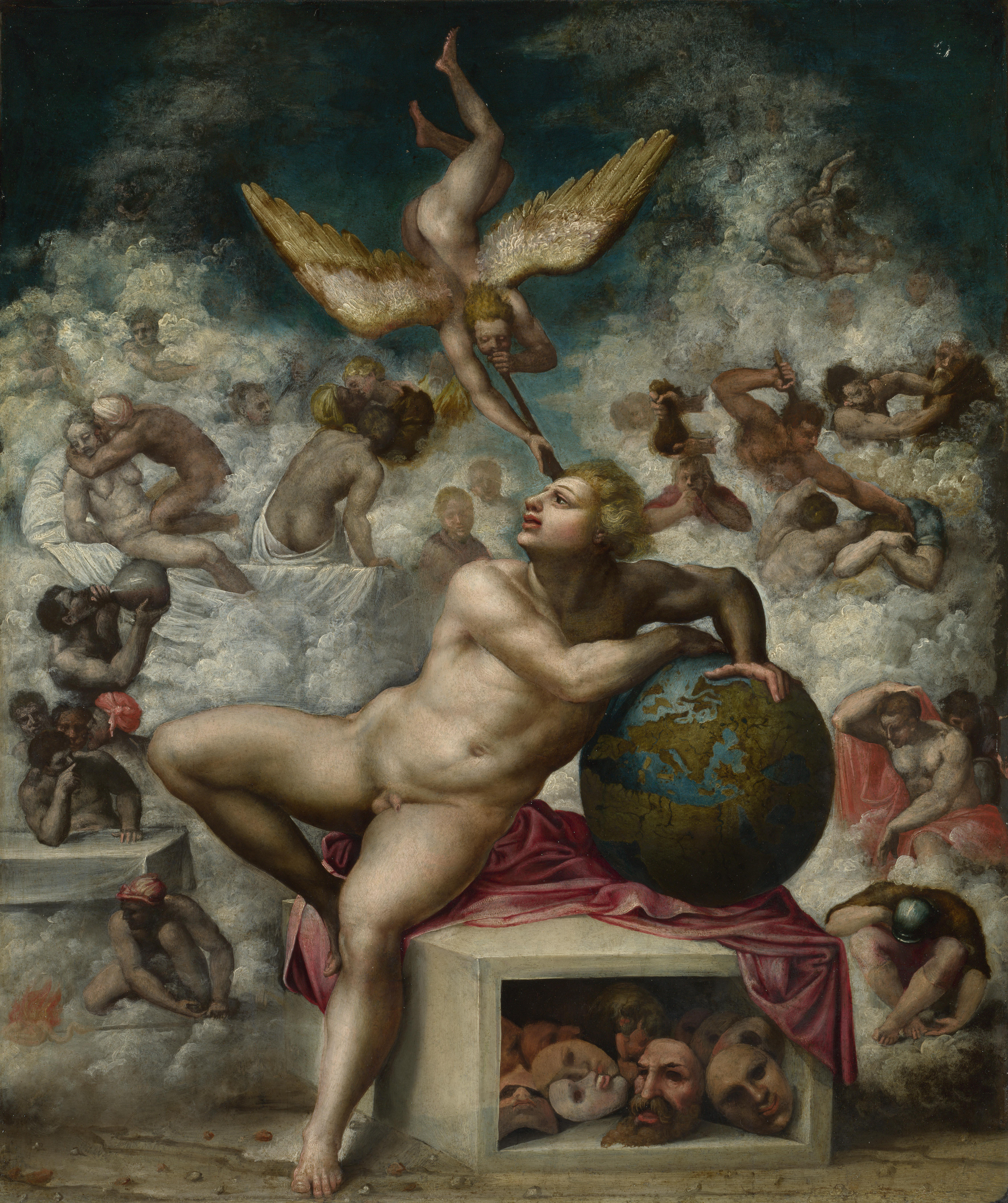
The Dream of Human Life, by unknown artist, based on Michelangelo’s drawing The Dream, c. 1533

The dream argument is the postulation that the act of dreaming provides preliminary evidence that the senses trusted to distinguish reality from illusion should not be fully trusted, and therefore, any state that is dependent on our senses should at the very least be carefully examined and rigorously tested to determine whether it is in fact reality.

== Synopsis ==
While dreaming, one does not normally realize one is dreaming. On more rare occasions, the dream may be contained inside another dream - equalling two dreams. However, the very act of realizing that one is dreaming two dreams simultaneously, means that a third dream state also exists, from within which the dreamer is aware of the other two dreams. This has led philosophers to wonder whether it is possible for one ever to be certain, at any given point in time, that one is not in fact dreaming, or whether indeed it could be possible for one to remain in a perpetual dream state and never experience the reality of wakefulness at all.

In Western philosophy this philosophical puzzle was referred to by Plato (Theaetetus 158b-d), Aristotle (Metaphysics 1011a6), and the Academic Skeptics. It is now best known from René Descartes' Meditations on First Philosophy. The dream argument has become one of the most prominent skeptical hypotheses.

In Eastern philosophy this type of argument is sometimes referred to as the "Zhuangzi paradox":

He who dreams of drinking wine may weep when morning comes; he who dreams of weeping may in the morning go off to hunt. While he is dreaming he does not know it is a dream, and in his dream he may even try to interpret a dream. Only after he wakes does he know it was a dream. And someday there will be a great awakening when we know that this is all a great dream. Yet the stupid believe they are awake, busily and brightly assuming they understand things, calling this man ruler, that one herdsman—how dense! Confucius and you are both dreaming! And when I say you are dreaming, I am dreaming, too. Words like these will be labeled the Supreme Swindle. Yet, after ten thousand generations, a great sage may appear who will know their meaning, and it will still be as though he appeared with astonishing speed.

The Yogachara philosopher Vasubandhu (4th to 5th century C.E.) referenced the argument in his "Twenty verses on appearance only." Attracted by dream culture in the book of Zhuang Zhou, Jacques Lacan and his followers applies Zhuang Zhou's thought about dreams to the realms of psychoanalysis and ideology.

The dream argument came to feature prominently in Mahayana and Tibetan Buddhist philosophy. Some schools of thought (e.g., Dzogchen) consider perceived reality to be literally unreal. As Chögyal Namkhai Norbu puts it: "In a real sense, all the visions that we see in our lifetime are like a big dream…" In this context, the term 'visions' denotes not only visual perceptions, but also appearances perceived through all senses, including sounds, smells, tastes, and tactile sensations, and operations on perceived mental objects.

== Simulated reality ==
Dreaming provides a springboard for those who question whether our own reality may be an illusion. The ability of the mind to be tricked into believing a mentally generated world is the "real world" means at least one variety of simulated reality is a common, even nightly event.

Those who argue that the world is not simulated must concede that the mind—at least the sleeping mind—is not itself an entirely reliable mechanism for attempting to differentiate reality from illusion.

Whatever I have accepted until now as most true has come to me through my senses. But occasionally I have found that they have deceived me, and it is unwise to trust completely those who have deceived us even once.

— René Descartes

== Critical discussion ==
In the past, philosophers John Locke and Thomas Hobbes have separately attempted to refute Descartes's account of the dream argument. Locke claimed that one cannot experience pain in dreams. Various scientific studies conducted within the last few decades provided evidence against Locke's claim by concluding that pain in dreams can occur, but on very rare occasions. Philosopher Ben Springett has said that Locke might respond to this by stating that the agonizing pain of stepping into a fire is non-comparable to stepping into a fire in a dream. Hobbes claimed that dreams are susceptible to absurdity while the waking life is not.

Many contemporary philosophers have attempted to refute dream skepticism in detail (see, e.g., Stone (1984)). Ernest Sosa (2007) devoted a chapter of a monograph to the topic, in which he presented a new theory of dreaming and argued that his theory raises a new argument for skepticism, which he attempted to refute. In A Virtue Epistemology: Apt Belief and Reflective Knowledge, he states: "in dreaming we do not really believe; we only make-believe." Jonathan Ichikawa (2008) and Nathan Ballantyne & Ian Evans (2010) have offered critiques of Sosa's proposed solution. Ichikawa argued that as we cannot tell whether our beliefs in waking life are truly beliefs and not imaginings, like in a dream, we are still not able to tell whether we are awake or dreaming.

The dream hypothesis is also used to develop other philosophical concepts, such as Valberg's personal horizon: what this world would be internal to if this were all a dream.

=== Dream skepticism ===
Norman Malcolm in his monograph "Dreaming" (published in 1959) elaborated on Wittgenstein's question as to whether it really mattered if people who tell dreams "really had these images while they slept, or whether it merely seems so to them on waking". He argues that the sentence "I am asleep" is a senseless form of words; that dreams cannot exist independently of the waking impression; and that skepticism based on dreaming "comes from confusing the historical and dream telling senses...[of]...the past tense" (page 120). In the chapter: "Do I Know I Am Awake ?" he argues that we do not have to say: "I know that I am awake" simply because it would be absurd to deny that one is awake.

Philosopher Daniel Dennett expanded on this idea with his cassette tape hypothesis of dreaming. He conjectured that dreams are not real conscious experiences, and are instead pseudo-memories that emerge upon awakening from sleep. These pseudo-memories do not correspond to any real dream experiences, and are instead strictly fabrications of experiences that never occurred.

Philosopher Jennifer Windt has counter-argued against dream skepticism, drawing on the psychology of lucid dreaming, and has advanced a conceptual framework of dreaming as real imaginative experiences.

== See also ==
- Brain in a vat
- Cartesian doubt
- Consensus reality
- Evil demon
- False awakening
- Maya (illusion)
- Multiverse
- Reality in Buddhism
- Simulated reality
- Social simulation
- Solipsism
- Zhuangzi (book) § "The Butterfly Dream"
