= Cartesian doubt =

Form of methodological skepticism

Cartesian doubt is a form of methodological skepticism associated with the writings and methodology of René Descartes. Cartesian doubt is also known as Cartesian skepticism, methodic doubt, methodological skepticism, universal doubt, systematic doubt, or hyperbolic doubt.

Cartesian doubt is a systematic process of being skeptical about (or doubting) the truth of one's beliefs, which has become a characteristic method in philosophy. Additionally, Descartes's method has been seen by many as the root of the modern scientific method. This method of doubt was largely popularized in Western philosophy by René Descartes, who sought to doubt the truth of all beliefs in order to determine which he could be certain were true. It is the basis for Descartes's statement, "cogito ergo sum" ('I think, therefore I am'). A fuller version of his phrase, "dubito ergo cogito, cogito ergo sum" translates to 'I doubt therefore I think, I think therefore I exist'. Sum translated as 'I exist' (per various Latin-to-English dictionaries) presents a much larger and clearer meaning to the phrase.

Methodological skepticism is distinguished from philosophical skepticism in that methodological skepticism is an approach that subjects all knowledge claims to scrutiny with the goal of sorting out true from false claims, whereas philosophical skepticism is an approach that questions the possibility of certain knowledge.

== Characteristics ==
Cartesian doubt is methodological. It uses doubt as a route to certain knowledge by identifying what cannot be doubted. The fallibility of sense data in particular is a subject of Cartesian doubt.

There are several interpretations as to the objective of Descartes's skepticism. Prominent among these is a foundationalist account, which claims that Descartes's skepticism aims to eliminate all belief that it is possible to doubt, thus leaving only basic beliefs (also known as foundational beliefs). From these indubitable basic beliefs, Descartes then attempts to derive further knowledge. It's an archetypal and significant example that epitomizes the Continental Rational schools of philosophy.

Mario Bunge argues that methodological skepticism presupposes that scientific theories and methods satisfy certain philosophical requirements: idealism, materialism, realism, rationalism, empiricism, and systemics, that the data and hypotheses of science constitute a system.

== Technique ==
Descartes's method of hyperbolic doubt included:

- Accepting only information you know is true
- Breaking down these truths into smaller units
- Solving the simple problems first
- Making complete lists of further problems

Hyperbolic doubt means having the tendency to doubt, since it is an extreme or exaggerated form of doubt. Knowledge in the Cartesian sense means to know something beyond not merely all reasonable doubt, but all possible doubt. In his Meditations on First Philosophy (1641), Descartes resolved to systematically doubt that any of his beliefs were true, in order to build, from the ground up, a belief system consisting of only certainly true beliefs; his end goal—or at least a major one—was to find an undoubtable basis for the sciences. Consider Descartes's opening lines of the Meditations:

Several years have now elapsed since I first became aware that I had accepted, even from my youth, many false opinions for true, and that consequently what I afterward based on such principles was highly doubtful; and from that time I was convinced of the necessity of undertaking once in my life to rid myself of all the opinions I had adopted, and of commencing anew the work of building from the foundation ...

— Descartes, Meditation I, 1641

== Descartes's method ==
René Descartes, the originator of Cartesian doubt, put all beliefs, ideas, thoughts, and matter in doubt. He showed that his grounds, or reasoning, for any knowledge could just as well be false. Sensory experience, the primary mode of knowledge, is often erroneous and therefore must be doubted. For instance, what one is seeing may very well be a hallucination. There is nothing that proves it cannot be. In short, if there is any way a belief can be disproved, then its grounds are insufficient. From this, Descartes proposed two arguments, the dream and the demon.

=== The dream argument ===
Descartes, knowing that the context of our dreams, while possibly unbelievable, are often lifelike, hypothesized that humans can only believe that they are awake. There are no sufficient grounds to distinguish a dream experience from a waking experience. For instance, Subject A sits at the computer, typing this article. Just as much evidence exists to indicate that the act of composing this article is reality as there is evidence to demonstrate the opposite. Descartes conceded that we live in a world that can create such ideas as dreams. However, by the end of The Meditations, he concludes that we can distinguish dream from reality at least in retrospect:

But when I distinctly see where things come from and where and when they come to me, and when I can connect my perceptions of them with the whole of the rest of my life without a break, then I am quite certain that when I encounter these things I am not asleep but awake.

— Descartes: Selected Philosophical Writings

=== The Evil Demon ===
Descartes reasoned that our very own experience may very well be controlled by an evil demon of sorts. This demon is as clever and deceitful as he is powerful. He could have created a superficial world that we may think we live in. As a result of this doubt, sometimes termed the Malicious Demon Hypothesis, Descartes found that he was unable to trust even the simplest of his perceptions.

In Meditation I, Descartes stated that if one were mad, even briefly, the insanity might have driven man into believing that what we thought was true could be merely our minds deceiving us. He also stated that there could be 'some malicious, powerful, cunning demon' that had deceived us, preventing us from judging correctly.

Descartes argued that all his senses were lying, and since your senses can easily fool you, his idea of an infinitely powerful being must be true—since that idea could have only been put there by an infinitely powerful being who would have no reason for deceit.

== I think, therefore I am ==
While methodic doubt has a nature, one need not hold that knowledge is impossible to apply the method of doubt. Indeed, Descartes's attempt to apply the method of doubt to the existence of himself spawned the proof of his famous saying, "cogito, ergo sum" ('I think, therefore I am'). That is, Descartes tried to doubt his own existence, but found that even his doubting showed that he existed, since he could not doubt if he did not exist.

== See also ==
- Academic skepticism
- Bracketing (phenomenology)
- Clinical equipoise
- Egocentric predicament
- Incontrovertible evidence
- Suspension of judgment
- Solipsism
- Theory of justification
