= Meditations on First Philosophy =

1641 book by René Descartes

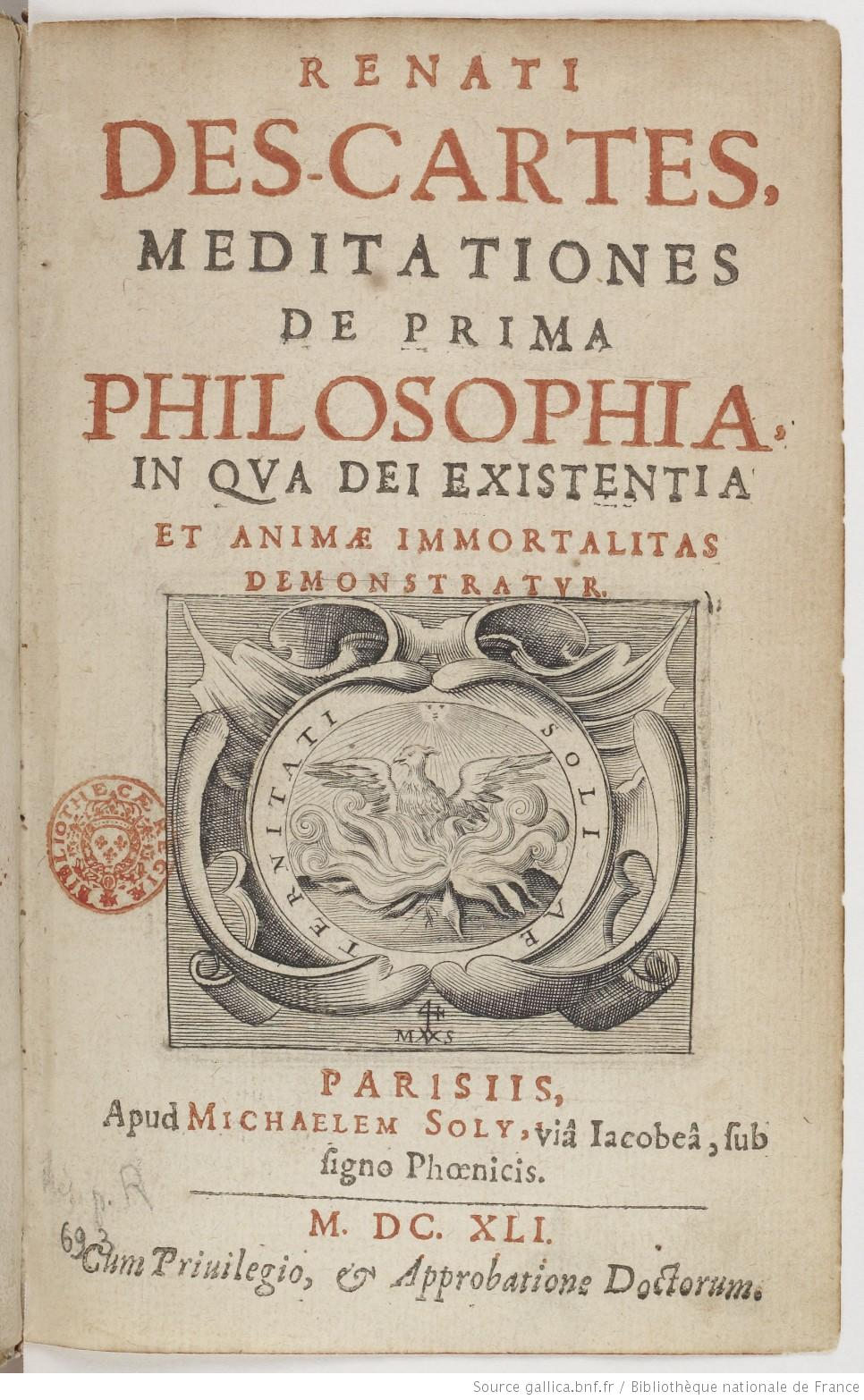
- The title page of the Meditations
- Author: René Descartes
- Original title: Meditationes de Prima Philosophia, in qua Dei existentia et animæ immortalitas demonstratur
- Language: Latin
- Subject: Philosophy
- Publication date: 1641
- Original text: Meditationes de Prima Philosophia, in qua Dei existentia et animæ immortalitas demonstratur at Latin Wikisource
- Translation: Meditations on First Philosophy at Wikisource

Meditations on First Philosophy, in which the existence of God and the immortality of the soul are demonstrated (Latin: Meditationes de Prima Philosophia, in qua Dei existentia et animæ immortalitas demonstratur), often simply called Meditations on First Philosophy or the Meditations, is a philosophical treatise by René Descartes first published in Latin in 1641. The French translation (by the Duke of Luynes with Descartes' supervision) was published in 1647 as Méditations Métaphysiques. The title may contain a misreading by the printer, mistaking animae immaterialitas for animae immortalitas, as suspected by A. Baillet.

The book is made up of six meditations, in which Descartes first discards all belief in things that are not absolutely certain, and then tries to establish what can be known for sure. He wrote the Meditations as if he had meditated for six days: each meditation refers to the last one as "yesterday". (In fact, Descartes began work on the Meditations in 1639.) One of the most influential philosophical texts ever written, it is widely read to this day.

The book consists of the presentation of Descartes' metaphysical system at its most detailed level and in the expanding of his philosophical system, first introduced in the fourth part of his Discourse on Method (1637). Descartes' metaphysical thought is also found in the Principles of Philosophy (1644), which the author intended to be a philosophical guidebook.

== Letter of Dedication and Preface ==
=== Letter of dedication ===
To the most wise and illustrious the Dean and Doctors of the Sacred Faculty of Theology in Paris

Descartes writes the above dedication to ask for the protection of the Faculty for his work.

His first consideration is that the existence of God has to be demonstrated philosophically, besides the theological reasons for belief, particularly if we consider to make a demonstration for the non-believers. Moreover, the believers could be accused of making a circular reasoning, when saying that we must believe in God because of the Scriptures, and in the authority of the Scriptures because they have been inspired by God. He further indicates how the very Scriptures say that the mind of man is sufficient to discover God.

His aim is to apply a method to demonstrate these two truths, in a so clear and evident manner that result to be evident. This method he has developed for the Sciences.

=== Preface to the reader ===
Descartes explains how he made a mention of the two questions, the existence of God, and the soul, in his Discourse on Method. Following this, he received objections, and two of them he considers are of importance. The first is how he concludes that the essence of the soul is a thing that thinks, excluding all other nature. To this he says that he has a clear perception that he is a thinking thing, and has no other clear perception, and from this he concludes that there is nothing else in the essence of the self.

The second is that from the idea I have of something that is more perfect than myself, it cannot be concluded that it exists. In the treatise we will see that in fact from the idea that there is something more perfect than myself, it follows that this exists.

It goes on to comment that on a general level the reasoning used by the atheists for denying the existence of God is based in the fact that "we ascribe to God affections that are human, or we attribute so much strength and wisdom to our minds" that we presume to understand that which God can and ought to do. He says that we have to consider God as incomprehensible and infinite, and our minds as limited and finite.

Finally, he says that the treatise was submitted to some men of learning to know their difficulties and objections, and are answered at the end of it.

== Structure ==
Descartes does not outline the text with a systematic structure. He writes the meditations in a first-person point-of-view, intending for the readers to meditate with him. Thus, the text serves as a handbook of meditative practices—it does not only convey a message, but an experience, too.

== Summary and analysis ==
The Meditations is written in the first person, so many authors refer to the arguments as simply spoken by René Descartes, but others consider that he is speaking in the person of an alter ego who they call "the meditator", as is done here sometimes. (Wikipedia is collaboratively edited, so no consistency has been enforced on this.)

=== I. What Can Be Called into Doubt ===
The First Meditation, subtitled "What can be called into doubt", opens with the Meditator reflecting on the number of falsehoods he has believed during his life and on the subsequent faultiness of the body of knowledge he has built up from these falsehoods. He has resolved to sweep away all he thinks he knows and to start again from the foundations, building up his knowledge once more on more certain grounds. He has seated himself alone, by the fire, free of all worries so that he can demolish his former opinions with care.

The Meditator reasons that he need only find some reason to doubt his present opinions in order to prompt him to seek sturdier foundations for knowledge. Rather than doubt every one of his opinions individually, he reasons that he might cast them all into doubt if he can doubt the foundations and basic principles on which the opinions are founded.

Everything that the Meditator has accepted as most true he has come to learn from or through his senses. He acknowledges that sometimes the senses can deceive, but only with respect to objects that are very small or far away, and that our sensory knowledge on the whole is quite sturdy. The Meditator acknowledges that insane people might be more deceived, but that he is clearly not one of them and needn't worry himself about that.

However, the Meditator realizes that he is often convinced when he is dreaming that he is sensing real objects. He feels certain that he is awake and sitting by the fire, but reflects that often he has dreamed this very sort of thing and been wholly convinced by it. Though his present sensations may be dream images, he suggests that even dream images are drawn from waking experience, much like paintings in that respect. Even when a painter creates an imaginary creature, like a mermaid, the composite parts are drawn from real things—women and fish, in the case of a mermaid. And even when a painter creates something entirely new, at least the colors in the painting are drawn from real experience. Thus, the Meditator concludes, though he can doubt composite things, he cannot doubt the simple and universal parts from which they are constructed like shape, quantity, size, time, etc. While we can doubt studies based on composite things, like medicine, astronomy, or physics, he concludes that we cannot doubt studies based on simple things, like arithmetic and geometry.

On further reflection, the Meditator realizes that even simple things can be doubted. Omnipotent God could make even our conception of mathematics false. One might argue that God is supremely good and would not lead him to believe falsely all these things. But by this reasoning we should think that God would not deceive him with regard to anything, and yet this is clearly not true. If we suppose there is no God, then there is even greater likelihood of being deceived, since our imperfect senses would not have been created by a perfect being.

The Meditator finds it almost impossible to keep his habitual opinions and assumptions out of his head, try as he might. He resolves to pretend that these opinions are totally false and imaginary in order to counterbalance his habitual way of thinking. The Meditator wishes to avoid an excess of skepticism and instead uses a skeptical method, an important distinction. He supposes that not God, but some evil demon has committed itself to deceiving him so that everything he thinks he knows is false. By doubting everything, he can at least be sure not to be misled into falsehood by this demon.

Before retiring for the night, the Meditator indulges in his old beliefs, afraid to awake to a life of confusion. As a result, he allows for the tempting falsehoods to continue unabridged.

==== Analysis ====
Descartes saw his Meditations as providing the metaphysical underpinning of his new physics. Like Galileo, he sought to overturn what he saw as two-thousand-year-old prejudices injected into the Western tradition by Aristotle. The Aristotelian thought of Descartes' day placed great weight on the testimony of the senses, suggesting that all knowledge comes from the senses. The Meditator's suggestion that all of one's most certain knowledge comes from the senses is meant to appeal directly to the Aristotelian philosophers who will be reading the Meditations. The motivation, then, behind the First Meditation is to start in a position the Aristotelian philosophers would agree with and then, subtly, to seduce them away from it. Descartes is aware of how revolutionary his ideas are, and must pay lip service to the orthodox opinions of the day in order to be heeded.

Reading the First Meditation as an effort to coax Aristotelians away from their customary opinions allows us to read different interpretations into the different stages of doubt. For instance, there is some debate as to whether Descartes intended his famous "Dream Argument" to suggest the universal possibility of dreaming—that though there is waking experience, I can never know which moments are dreams and which are waking—or the possibility of a universal dream—that my whole life is a dream and that there is no waking world. If we read Descartes as suggesting the universal possibility of dreaming, we can explain an important distinction between the Dream Argument and the later "Evil Demon" argument. The latter suggests that all we know is false and that we cannot trust the senses one bit. The Dream Argument, if meant to suggest the universal possibility of dreaming, suggests only that the senses are not always and wholly reliable. The Dream Argument questions Aristotelian epistemology, while the Evil Demon Argument does away with it altogether. The Painter's Analogy, which draws on the Dream Argument, concludes that mathematics and other purely cerebral studies are far more certain than astronomy or physics, which is an important step away from the Aristotelian reliance on the senses and toward Cartesian rationalism.

Read on its own, the First Meditation can be seen as presenting skeptical doubts as a subject of study in their own right. Descartes raised the mystifying question of how we can claim to know with certainty anything about the world around us. The idea is not that these doubts are probable, but that their possibility can never be entirely ruled out. And if we can never be certain, how can we claim to know anything? Skepticism cuts straight to the heart of the Western philosophical enterprise and its attempt to provide a certain foundation for our knowledge and understanding of the world. It can even be pushed so far as to be read as a challenge to our very notion of rationality.

It is difficult to justify a dismissal of skepticism. Western philosophy since Descartes has been largely marked and motivated by an effort to overcome this problem. Descartes' doubt is a methodological and rational doubt. That is, the Meditator is not just doubting everything at random, but is providing solid reasons for his doubt at each stage. For instance, he rejects the possibility that he might be mad since that would undercut the rationality that motivates his doubt. Descartes is trying to set up this doubt within a rational framework and needs to maintain a claim to rationality for his arguments to proceed. He goes on to suggest more powerful reasons to doubt that his beliefs are true. In general, his method is that of forming skeptical hypotheses—methodic doubt. In the first meditation, he considers whether he is mad, dreaming, or deceived by an evil demon.

The general form of these arguments is:

1. If I am dreaming/deceived, then my beliefs are unreliable

Descartes' goal, as stated at the beginning of the meditation, is to suspend judgment about any belief that is even slightly doubtful. The skeptical scenarios show that all of the beliefs he considers in the first meditation—including, at the very least, all his beliefs about the physical world, are doubtful. So he decides to suspend judgment. He will henceforth give up all of his beliefs about the physical world. He also decides to continually remind himself to avoid habitually falling into accepting beliefs without support, a habit to which he is susceptible.

=== II. The Nature of the Human Mind ===
In Meditation II: Concerning the Nature of the Human Mind: That the mind is more known than the body, Descartes lays out a pattern of thought, sometimes called representationalism, in response to the doubts forwarded in Meditation I. He identifies five steps in this theory:

1. We have access to only the world of our ideas; things in the world are accessed only indirectly.
2. These ideas are understood to include all of the contents of the mind, including perceptions, images, memories, concepts, beliefs, intentions, decisions, etc.
3. Ideas and the things they represent are separate from each other.
4. These represented things are many times "external" to the mind.
5. It is possible for these ideas to constitute either accurate or false representations.

Descartes argues that this representational theory disconnects the world from the mind, leading to the need for some sort of bridge to span the separation and provide good reasons to believe that the ideas accurately represent the outside world. The first plank he uses in constructing this bridge can be found in the following excerpt:

I have convinced myself that there is nothing in the world — no sky, no earth, no minds, no bodies. Doesn't it follow that I don't exist? No, surely I must exist if it's me who is convinced of something. But there is a deceiver, supremely powerful and cunning whose aim is to see that I am always deceived. But surely I exist, if I am deceived. Let him deceive me all he can, he will never make it the case that I am nothing while I think that I am something. Thus having fully weighed every consideration, I must finally conclude that the statement "I am, I exist" must be true whenever I state it or mentally consider it.

In other words, one's consciousness implies one's existence. In one of Descartes' replies to objections to the book, he summed this up in the phrase cogito, ergo sum, 'I think therefore I am.'

Once he secures his existence, however, Descartes seeks to find out what "I" is. He rejects the typical method, which looks for a definition (e.g., Rational Animal), because the words used in the definition would then need to be defined. He seeks simple terms that do not need to be defined in this way, but whose meaning can just be "seen." From these self-evident truths, complex terms can be built up.

The first of these self-evident truths is Descartes' proof of existence turned on its head:

But what then am I? A thinking thing. And what is that? Something that doubts, understands, affirms, denies, wills, refuses, and also senses and has mental images.

Despite being rationally convinced that he is more certain of his own thought than he is of sensory data, he still intuitively feels that the physical senses are more distinctly recognized. To overcome this intuitive resistance, Descartes turns to the example of wax. He determines that wax is not wax because of its color, texture or shape, as all of these things can change and the substance still be wax. He believes that wax is perceived "by the intellect alone." Therefore, he distinguishes between ordinary perception and judgment. When one understands the nature of the substance, such as its expansion under heat, figure and motion, the wax can be perceived by the mind alone regardless of the form it takes. This example concretely assures Descartes that pure rationality is not epistemologically inferior to the bodily senses, leading him to state that "nothing can be perceived by me more easily or more clearly than my own mind."

Descartes concludes with this newfound knowledge, but decides to pause for a while in order to embed it within his memory, since long-held opinions are not easily changed.

=== III. Concerning God, That He Exists ===
Descartes proposed that there are three types of ideas:

1. Innate: ideas that are, and have always been, within us;
2. Fictitious (or Invented): ideas that come from our imagination; and
3. Adventitious: ideas that come from experiences of the world.

Descartes argues that the idea of God is innate and placed in us by God, and rejects the possibility of such being invented or adventitious.

Argument 1

1. Something cannot come from nothing.
2. The cause of an idea must have at least as much formal reality as the idea has objective reality. (Formal as in actually existent, objective as in they can be represented to the mind.)
3. I have in me an idea of God. This idea has infinite objective reality.
4. I cannot be the cause of this idea, since I am not an infinite and perfect being. I don't have enough formal reality. Only an infinite and perfect being could cause such an idea.
5. So God—a being with infinite formal reality—must exist (and be the source of my idea of God).
6. An absolutely perfect being is a good, benevolent being.
7. So God is benevolent...
8. So God would not deceive me, and would not permit me to err without giving me a way to correct my errors.

Argument 2

1. I exist.
2. My existence must have a cause.
3. The only possible ultimate causes are:
  1. myself
  2. my always having existed
  3. my parents
  4. something less perfect than God
  5. God
4. Not a.: If I had created myself, I would have made myself perfect.
5. Not b.: This does not solve the problem. If I am a dependent being, I need to be continually sustained by another.
6. Not c.: This leads to an infinite regress.
7. Not d.: The idea of perfection that exists in me cannot have originated from a non-perfect being.
8. Therefore, e. God exists.

Descartes argued that he had a clear and distinct idea of God. In the same way that the cogito was self-evident, so too is the existence of God, as his perfect idea of a perfect being could not have been caused by anything less than a perfect being.

=== IV. Concerning the True and the False ===
The conclusions of the previous Meditations that "I" and "God" both exist lead to another problem: If God is perfectly good and the source of all that is, how is there room for error or falsehood? Descartes attempts to answer this question in Meditation IV: On Truth and Falsity:

If I've got everything in me from God and He hasn't given me the ability to make errors, it doesn't seem possible for me ever to be in error.

The framework of his arguments centers on the great chain of being, in which God's perfect goodness is relative to His perfect being. On the extreme opposite end of the scale is complete nothingness, which is also the most evil state possible. Thus, humans are an intermediary between these two extremes, being less "real" or "good" than God, but more "real" and "good" than nothingness. Thus, error (as a part of evil) is not a positive reality, it is only the absence of what is correct. In this way, its existence is allowed within the context of a perfectly inerrant God.

I find that I am "intermediate" between God and nothingness, between the supreme entity and nonentity. Insofar as I am the creation of the supreme entity, there's nothing in me to account for my being deceived or led into error, but, inasmuch as I somehow participate in nothing or nonentity — that is, insofar as I am distinct from the supreme entity itself and lack many things — it's not surprising that I go wrong. I thus understand that, in itself, error is a lack, rather than a real thing dependent on God. Hence, I understand that I can err without God's having given me a special ability to do so. Rather, I fall into error because my God-given ability to judge the truth is not infinite.

Descartes also concedes two points that might allow for the possibility of his ability to make errors. First, he notes that it is very possible that his limited knowledge prevents him from understanding why God chose to create him so he could make mistakes. If he could see the things that God could see, with a complete and infinite scope, perhaps he would judge his ability to err as the best option. He uses this point to attack the Aristotelian structure of causes. The final cause described by Aristotle are the "what for" of an object, but Descartes claims that because he is unable to comprehend completely the mind of God, it is impossible to understand completely the "why" through science—only the "how."

I realize that I shouldn't be surprised at God's doing things that I can't explain. I shouldn't doubt His existence just because I find that I sometimes can't understand why or how He has made something. I know that my nature is weak and limited and that God's is limitless, incomprehensible, and infinite, and, from this, I can infer that He can do innumerable things whose reasons are unknown to me. On this ground alone, I regard the common practice of explaining things in terms of their purposes to be useless in physics: it would be foolhardy of me to think that I can discover God's purposes.

Secondly, he considers the possibility that an apparent error at the individual level could be understood within the totality of creation as error free.

When asking whether God's works are perfect, I ought to look at all of them together, not at one isolation. For something that seems imperfect when viewed alone might seem completely perfect when regarded as having a place in the world. Of course, since calling everything into doubt, I haven't established that anything exists besides me and God. But, when I consider God's immense power, I can't deny that He has made — or, in any case, that He could have made — many other things, and I must therefore view myself as having a place in a universe.

Lastly, Meditation IV attributes the source of error to a discrepancy between two divine gifts: understanding and free will. Understanding is given in an incomplete form, while will (by nature) can only be either completely given or not given at all. When he is presented with a certain amount of understanding and then chooses to act outside of that, he is in error. Thus, the gifts of God (understanding and will) both remain good and only the incorrect usage by him remains as error.

If I suspend judgement when I don't clearly and distinctly grasp what is true, I obviously do right and am not deceived. But, if I either affirm or deny in a case of this sort, I misuse my freedom of choice. If I affirm what is false, I clearly err, and, if I stumble onto the truth, I'm still blameworthy since the light of nature reveals that a perception of the understanding should always precede a decision of the will. In these misuses of freedom of choice lies the deprivation that accounts for error. And this deprivation, I maintain, lies in the working of the will insofar as it comes from me — not in my God-given ability to will, or even in the will's operation insofar as it derives from Him.

=== V. The Essence of Material Things, and Again Concerning God, That He Exists ===
Meditation V: Concerning the Essence of Material Things, and Again Concerning God, That He Exists begins with the stated purpose of expanding the "known items" of God and self to include outside material objects; but Descartes saves that for Meditation VI in lieu of something he deems more fundamental but in the same direction: a discussion concerning the ideas of those external items. Along the way, he advances another logical proof of God's existence.

Before asking whether any such objects exist outside me, I ought to consider the ideas of these objects as they exist in my thoughts and see which are clear and which confused.

Descartes separates external objects into those that are clear and distinct and those that are confused and obscure. The former group consists of the ideas of extension, duration and movement. These geometrical ideas cannot be misconstrued or combined in a way that makes them false. For example, if the idea of a creature with the head of a giraffe, the body of a lion and tail of a beaver was constructed and the question asked if the creature had a large intestine, the answer would have to be invented. But, no mathematical re-arrangement of a triangle could allow its three internal angles to sum to anything but 180 degrees. Thus, Descartes perceived that truths may have a nature or essence of themselves, independent of the thinker. In Descartes' formulation, this is a mathematical truth only pragmatically related to nature; the properties of triangles in Euclidean geometry remain mathematically certain.

I find in myself innumerable ideas of things which, though they may not exist outside me, can't be said to be nothing. While I have some control over my thoughts of these things, I do not make the things up: they have their own real and immutable natures. Suppose, for example, that I have a mental image of a triangle. While it may be that no figure of this sort does exist or ever has existed outside my thought, the figure has a fixed nature (essence or form), immutable and eternal, which hasn't been produced by me and isn't dependent of my mind.

While thinking about the independence of these ideas of external objects, Descartes realizes that he is just as certain about God as he is about these mathematical ideas. He asserts that this is natural as the ideas of God are the only ideas that imply God's existence. He uses the example of a mountain and a valley. While one cannot picture a mountain without a valley, it's possible that these do not exist. However, the fact that one cannot conceive of God without existence inherently rules out the possibility of God's non-existence. Simply put, the argument is framed as follows:

1. God is defined as an infinitely perfect being.
2. Perfection includes existence.
3. So God exists.

This ontological argument originated in the work of St. Anselm, the medieval Scholastic philosopher and theologian. While Descartes had already claimed to have confirmed God's existence through previous arguments, this one allows him to put to rest any discontent he might have had with his "distinct and clear" criteria for truth. With a confirmed existence of God, all doubt that what one previously thought was real and not a dream can be removed. Having made this realization, Descartes asserts that without this sure knowledge in the existence of a supreme and perfect being, assurance of any truth is impossible:

Thus I plainly see that the certainty and truth of all my knowledge derives from one thing: my thought of the true God. Before I knew Him, I couldn't know anything else perfectly. But now I can plainly and certainly know innumerable things, not only about God and other mental beings, but also about the nature of physical objects, insofar as it is the subject-matter of pure mathematics.

=== VI. The Existence of Material Things, and the Real Distinction between Mind and Body ===
In Meditation VI: Concerning the Existence of Material Things, and the Real Distinction between Mind and Body, Descartes addresses the potential existence of material outside of the self and God. First, he asserts that such objects can exist simply because God is able to make them.

Insofar as they are the subject of pure mathematics, I now know at least that they can exist, because I grasp them clearly and distinctly. For God can undoubtedly make whatever I can grasp in this way, and I never judge that something is impossible for Him to make unless there would be a contradiction in my grasping the thing distinctly.

Knowing that the existence of such objects is possible, Descartes then turns to the prevalence of mental images as proof. To do this, he draws a distinction between imagination and understanding—imagination being a non-linguistic "faculty of knowledge to the body which is immediately present to it…without intellection or conception," which therefore exists like a mental photograph; and understanding (or apprehending) being something that is not necessarily pictured. He uses an example of this to clarify:

When I have a mental image of a triangle, for example, I don't just understand that it is a figure bounded by three lines; I also "look at" the lines as though they were present to my mind's eye. And this is what I call having a mental image. When I want to think of a chiliagon, I understand that it is a figure with a thousand sides as well as I understand that a triangle is a figure with three, but I can't imagine its sides or "look" at them as though they were present.… Thus I observe that a special effort of mind is necessary to the act of imagination, which is not required to conceiving or understanding (ad intelligendum); and this special exertion of mind clearly shows the difference between imagination and pure intellection (imaginatio et intellectio pura).

Descartes has still not given proof that such external objects exist. At this point, he has only shown that their existence could conveniently explain this mental process. To obtain this proof, he first reviews his premises for the Meditations—that the senses cannot be trusted and what he is taught "by nature" does not have much credence. However, he views these arguments within a new context; after writing Meditation I, he has proved the existence of himself and of a perfect God. Thus, Descartes jumps quickly to proofs of the division between the body and mind and that material things exist:

Proof of the body being distinct from the mind (mind–body dualism)

1. It is possible for God to create anything I can clearly and distinctly perceive.
2. If God creates something to be independent of another, they are distinct from each other.
3. I clearly and distinctly understand my existence as a thinking thing (which does not require the existence of a body).
4. So God can create a thinking thing independently of a body.
5. I clearly and distinctly understand my body as an extended thing (which does not require a mind).
6. So God can create a body independently of a mind.
7. So my mind is a reality distinct from my body.
8. So I (a thinking thing) can exist without a body.

Proof of the reality of external material things

1. I have a "strong inclination" to believe in the reality of external material things due to my senses.
2. God must have created me with this nature.
3. If independent material things do not exist, God is a deceiver.
4. But God is not a deceiver.
5. So material things exist and contain the properties essential to them.

After using these two arguments to dispel solipsism and skepticism, Descartes seems to have succeeded in defining reality as being in three parts: God (infinite), minds, and material things (both finite). He closes by addressing natural phenomena that might appear to challenge his philosophy, such as phantom limbs, dreams, and dropsy.

== Objections and replies ==
Before publishing the Meditations, Descartes submitted his manuscript to many philosophers, theologians and a logician, encouraging them to criticize the work. He explained this purpose in a letter to a friend: "I will be very glad if people put to me many objections, the strongest they can find, for I hope that the truth will stand out all the better." The objections which he gathered, and his own replies (many of which are quite extensive), were included in the first publication of the Meditations.

The seven objectors were, in order (of the sets as they were published):

1. The Dutch theologian Johannes Caterus (Johan de Kater).
2. Various "theologians and philosophers" gathered by Descartes' friend and principal correspondent, Friar Marin Mersenne.
3. The English philosopher Thomas Hobbes.
4. The theologian and logician Antoine Arnauld.
5. The philosopher Pierre Gassendi — Descartes wrote that this set of objections could be easily dismissed.
6. Another miscellany gathered by Mersenne.
7. The Jesuit Pierre Bourdin.

Some of the most powerful objections include the following:

Objections to proof(s) of God's existence:

1. We have no (clear) idea of an infinite Being (1st, 2nd, and 5th objections).
2. From the fact that I can think of a perfect being, it does not follow that the perfect being exists (1st, 2nd, and 5th).
3. We could get the idea of God without God's causing the idea (2nd, 3rd).
4. Nothing can cause itself to exist (4th), so God cannot cause himself to exist unless God is composed of some essence that in and of itself has the property of timelessness.
5. Potential begging the question in assuming God's existence via God's immutability and presence (1st, 4th).

Objections to the epistemology:

1. How can we be sure that what we think is a clear and distinct perception really is clear and distinct (3rd, 5th)?
2. Circle objection 1: if we are not certain that judgments based on clear and distinct ideas are true before we prove God’s existence, then we cannot be certain that we are a thinking thing (2nd). Circle objection 2: if we are not certain that clear and distinct ideas are true before we prove God's existence, then we cannot be certain that God exists, since we use clear and distinct ideas to prove God's existence (4th).
3. Contrary to what Descartes argues, we are certain that bodies exist/that perception coincides with reality (5th, 6th), but we are not certain that the bodies of our perception are actual bodies in an existent external world.
4. Descartes' distrust of the senses is very ridiculous. An example is given of a stick that refracts under water, for which it might appear to be truly bent via sight alone, but upon further inspection using the senses itself, is found to be not bent. This is done without the intervention of the intellect/mind (6th).

Objections to philosophy of mind:

1. Ideas are always imagistic (3rd), so we have no idea of thinking substance (non-image idea).
2. We cannot conclude that the mind (thinking thing) is not also a corporeal thing, unless we know that we know everything about the mind. But we do not know that we know everything about the mind. So we do not know that the mind is not corporeal. (2nd, 4th, 5th, 7th).

Elisabeth of Bohemia also corresponded with Descartes on the Meditations. She objected both to his description of the union between mind and body, and that virtue and moral truths seem to need to be grasped by something other than the intellect (despite Descartes' assertion that all truths must be grasped intellectually).

Descartes' philosophy of solipsism involves the assumption that a given individual will know their own mind best. However, the establishment of behaviorism revealed introspection to be a problematic method. Developments in psychology, based on studies focusing on the relationship between the mind and brain make it difficult to accept Descartes' contention that the mind can exist without the body. Further, empirical and philosophical work has shown that the mind, or consciousness, develops as a result of social, linguistic, and cultural influence.

== Influence and legacy ==
The historical impact of the six meditations has been divided. The first two meditations, which employed the skeptical methodic doubt and concluded that only the ego and its thoughts are indubitable, have had a huge impact in the history of philosophy. They are often considered as epoch-making for modernity, and an unavoidable first step for any modern philosophical thinking.

Arthur David Smith, author of the Routledge Philosophy Guidebook to Husserl, claims that since Edmund Husserl usually refers only to "the first two" of the Meditations, therefore Husserl must have thought that they are the only part of Descartes' work with any philosophical importance at all.

== Republications ==
=== Collected works in French and Latin ===
- Oeuvres de Descartes, edited by Charles Adam and Paul Tannery, Paris: Léopold Cerf, 1897–1913, 13 volumes; new revised edition, Paris: Vrin-CNRS, 1964–1974, 11 volumes (the first 5 volumes contains the correspondence).

=== English translations ===
- The Philosophical Writings Of Descartes, 3 vols., translated by John Cottingham, Robert Stoothoff, and Dugald Murdoch (Cambridge: Cambridge University Press, 1988).
- The Philosophical Works of Descartes, 2 vols, translated by Elizabeth S. Haldane, and G.R.T. Ross (Cambridge: Cambridge University Press, 1978).
- The Method, Meditations and Philosophy of Descartes, translated by John Veitch (1901)

=== Single works ===
- Cottingham, John, ed. (April 1996) [1986]. Meditations on First Philosophy: With Selections from the Objections and Replies (revised ed.). Cambridge University Press. ISBN 978-0-521-55818-1.
- Six Metaphysical Meditations ..., translated by William Molyneux (1680)
- Méditations Métaphysiques, translated to French from Latin by Michelle Beyssade (Paris: GF, 1993), accompanied by Descartes' original Latin text and the French translation by the Duke of Luynes (1647).

== See also ==
- 17th-century philosophy
- Cartesian Meditations
