= Giuseppa Barbapiccola =

Italian natural philosopher, poet, and translator

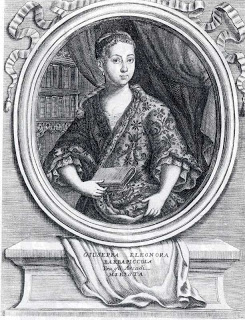
Portrait of Giuseppa Barbapiccola, engraved by Neapolitan artist Francesco De Grado

Giuseppa Eleonora Barbapiccola (1702 – ca 1740) was an Italian natural philosopher, poet and translator. She is best known for her translation of René Descartes' Principles of Philosophy to Italian in 1722. In her preface to her translation of Principles of Philosophy, Barbapiccola claimed that women, in contrast to the belief of her contemporaries, were not intellectually inferior out of nature, but because of their lack of education. Neapolitan scholars credited Barbapiccola as the individual who brought Cartesianism thought to Italy.

== Background ==
Barbapiccola was probably born in Naples, and her family seemed to have originally come from Salerno. Her uncle was Tommaso Maria Alfani, an acclaimed Dominican preacher in Naples and a correspondent of Giambattista Vico. Although nothing is known of her parents, it is arguable that her uncle influenced her upbringing in education and learning.

She was a member of the Accademia degli Arcadi in Bologna under the name Myristic. She often published her poems in collaboration with her friend, the poet Luisa Vico.

== Education ==
There is no known information on Barbapiccola's formal education. However, it is suggested that much of her knowledge accumulated by means of conversations in Neapolitan salons. In particular, it was most likely in the home of Italian philosopher Giambattista Vico where she obtained most of her knowledge, as Vico was the father of her close friend, Luisa From her correspondence with Vico's daughter and with Vico himself it can be deducted that she was a close friend of the Vico family and a noted member of the Neapolitan intellectual circles.

== Preface: The role for women and education ==
In the lengthy preface to her translation of René Descartes' Principles of Philosophy to Italian, published in 1722, Barbapiccola defended women's intellectual ability, their right to meaningful education, and their claim to a voice in an intellectual discourse dominated by men. She starts with an apology and defends her translation against the arguments for women's intellectual inferiority, such as those advanced by Homer, Herodotus, and Claude Fleury. Barbapiccola subsequently provides an account of women's achievements throughout history, citing among others Daphne, Diotima, Queen Christina of Sweden and Anne Lefevre. She also seeks to disseminate the Cartesian philosophy of Descartes, who accorded intellectual authority to women. She dedicated the translation to Queen Elizabeth Stuart of Bohemia, with whom Descartes maintained an extended philosophical exchange.

But then if one looks carefully and clearly, women should not be excluded from the study of the sciences, since their spirits are more elevated and they are not inferior to men in terms of the greatest virtues."

— Giuseppa Barbapiccola, in her preface to her translation of Principles of Philosophy

Barbapiccola identified women as the beneficiaries of her translation. As she seeks to counterbalance the deficiencies of women's traditional education in "the Catechism, sewing, diverse little works, singing, dance, fashion dress, courteous behaviour, and polite speech". Instead she seeks to impart the clear and coherent method of intellectual inquiry of Cartesian philosophy.

== In popular culture ==
In Cibola Burn, the fourth book of The Expanse series, a spaceship bears the name Barbapiccola. The ship and its name also feature in season 4 of the television series.
