= Principles of Philosophy =

Book by Descartes

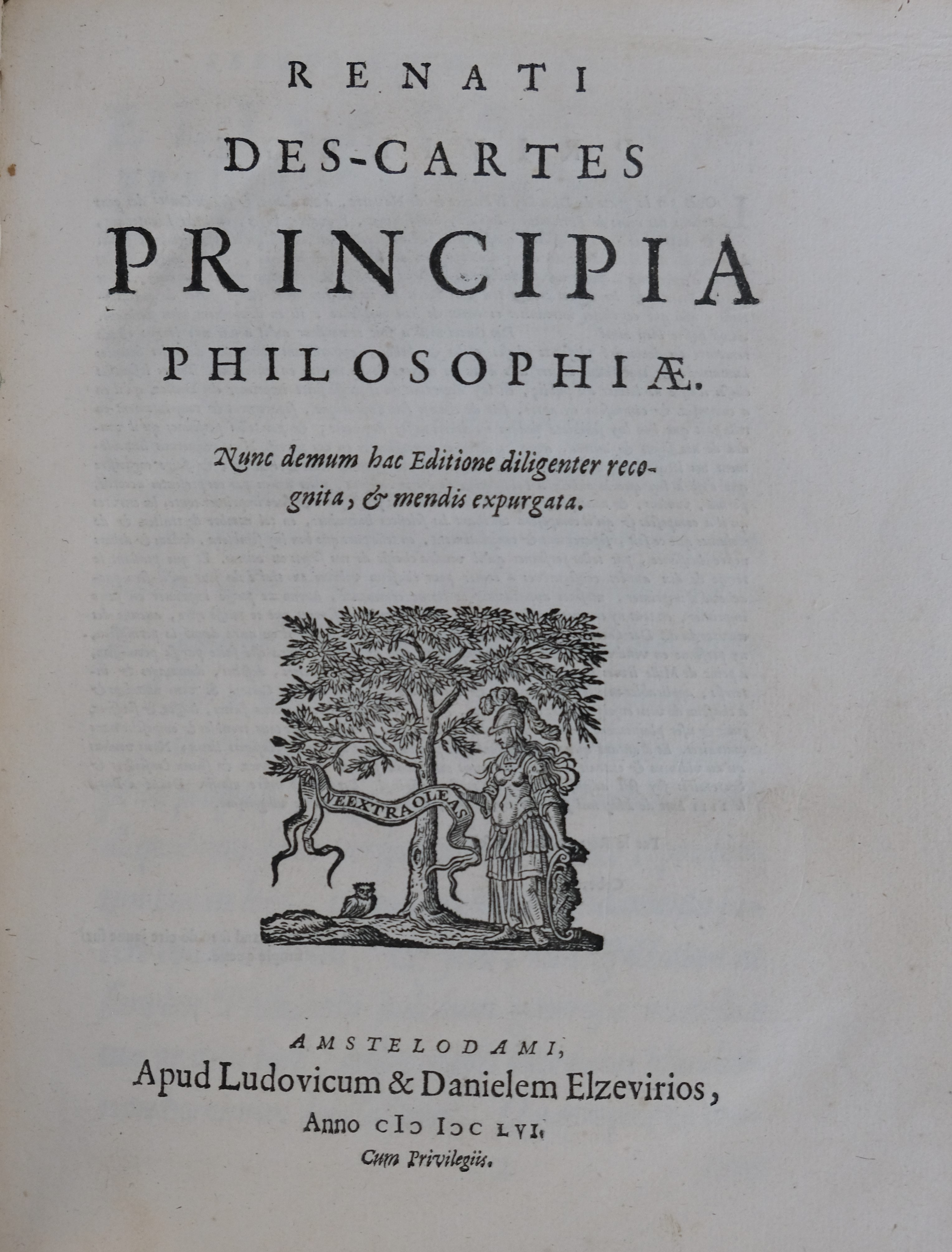
- Principia Philosophiæ, 1656
- Author: René Descartes
- Original title: Principia Philosophiæ
- Translator: Abbot Claude Picot (French)
- Language: Latin
- Subject: Philosophy, science
- Published: 1644

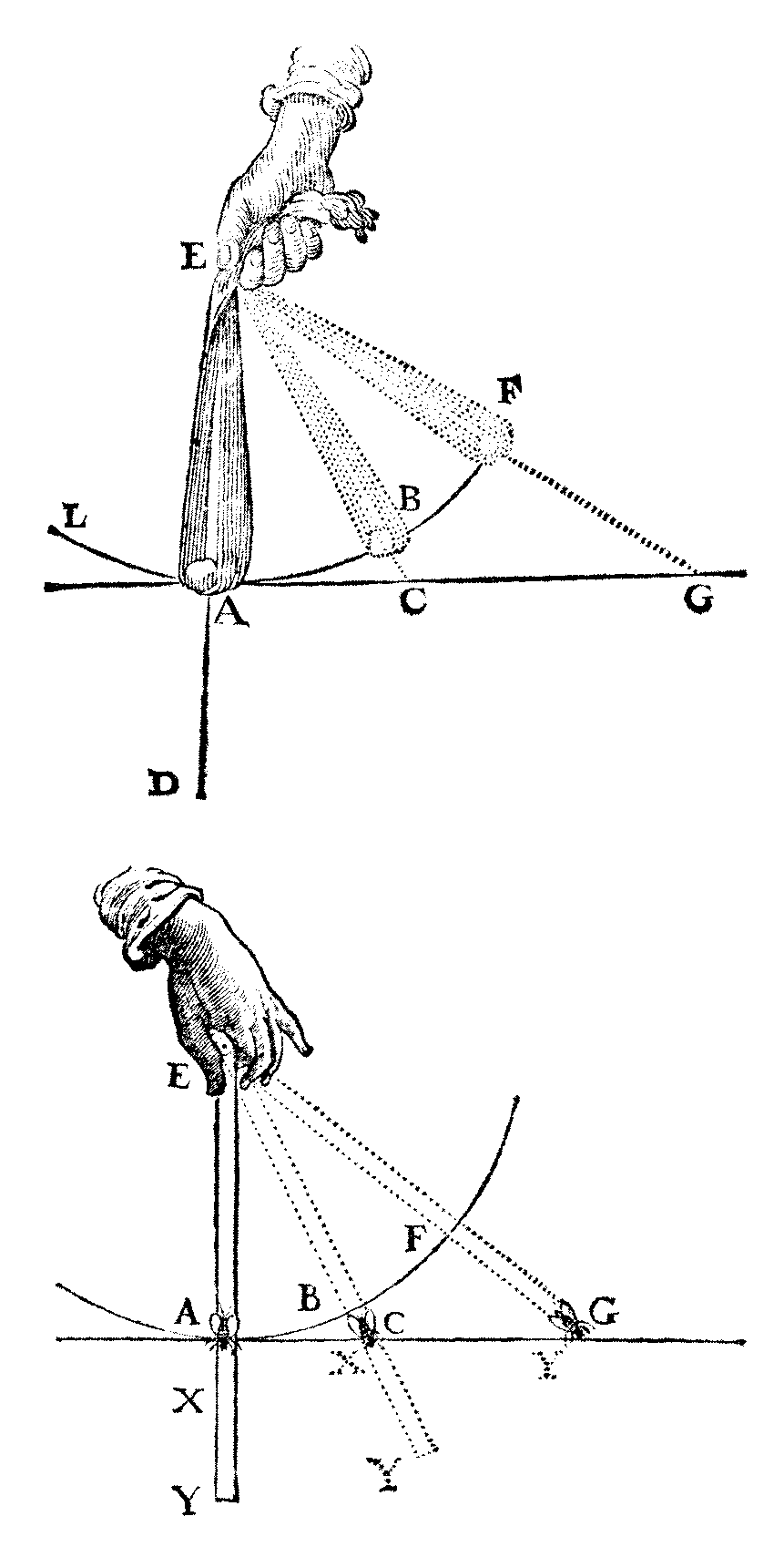
The illustration of movement of objects from the Principles

Principles of Philosophy (Latin: Principia Philosophiae) is a book by the French philosopher and scientist René Descartes. In essence, it is a synthesis of the Discourse on Method and Meditations on First Philosophy. It was written in Latin, published in 1644 and dedicated to Elisabeth of Bohemia, with whom Descartes had a long-standing friendship. A French version (Les Principes de la Philosophie) followed in 1647.

The book sets forth the principles of nature—the laws of physics—as Descartes viewed them. Most notably, it set forth the principle that in the absence of external forces, an object's motion will be uniform and in a straight line. Isaac Newton borrowed this principle from Descartes and included it in his own Principia; to this day, it is still generally referred to as Newton's first law of motion. The book was primarily intended to replace the Aristotelian curriculum then used in French and British universities. The work provides a systematic statement of his metaphysics and natural philosophy, and represents the first truly comprehensive, mechanistic account of the universe.

== Contents ==
=== Preface to the French edition ===
Descartes asked Abbot Claude Picot to translate his Latin Principia Philosophiae into French. For this edition, he wrote a preface disguised as a letter to the translator, whose title is "Letter of the author to the translator of the book, that may be used as a preface." This was published in 1647, when he was 51 years old and in the mature, final period of his life. In this writing, Descartes provides some reflections on his ideas of wisdom and philosophy. Its content may be summarized as follows:

Concept of philosophy

Philosophy is the study of wisdom, understood as the ability to conduct the human activities; and also as the perfect knowledge of all the things that a man can know for the direction of his life, maintenance of his health, and knowledge of the arts. Only God is perfectly wise, and the man is more or less wise, in proportion to the knowledge he has of the most important truths. Because of this, it is argued that none of our beliefs are able to be justified without the existence of god.

Substance, principles, and universals

He posits that all universal properties (such as mathematical objects/theorems) are the least prone to misinterpretation and misjudgment. As for the theory of substance, this is used to develop a wide variety of metaphysical concepts, such as the application of some universal attributes of substances.

The degrees of knowledge

Descartes identifies four degrees of knowledge which he names common, and a fifth degree he designates higher. The first degree consists of clear and evident notions that can be acquired without the need for any meditation. The second degree is all that is learned by means of the senses. The third comprises what we learn when talking with others. The fourth consists of what we can learn from the writings of those capable of giving good instructions.

Higher wisdom

There have been great people throughout history who have pursued a better and more secure wisdom, a fifth degree of knowledge. This has consisted of the search for the first causes, and those that have followed this pursuit have been named philosophers, but he thinks that none have yet been successful.

Doubt and certainty

Since Plato and Aristotle, there has been discussion on doubt and certainty. Those that have favoured doubt have arrived at extremes of doubting even the most evident things, and those that have sought certainty have relied excessively on the senses. Though it has been accepted that the senses may mislead us, according to Descartes, nobody had yet expressed that the truth can not be based on the senses, but in the understanding, when it is founded on evident and distinguishing perceptions compared to other perceived information.

Meditations on first philosophy

The search for the first causes, or basic truths, as undertaken by Descartes is contained in this work. It explains the metaphysical principles on which to build the rest of knowledge.

The tree of philosophy

Descartes describes philosophy as like a tree, whose roots are metaphysics, its trunk physics, and the branches are the rest of the sciences, mainly medicine, mechanics, and morals that is the last level of wisdom. In the same way that trees have fruits in their outer parts, the usefulness of philosophy is also contained in the areas that stem from its foundation.

Causes of lapses in judgment

Descartes lays out five key causes which lead to errors in making judgments about certain things. These include (a) early prejudices, cognitive biases, and heuristics formed during childhood, (b) trouble with forgetting these childhood-formed prejudices later in life, (c) mental fatigue regarding thinking about concepts which are not immediately available/obvious to the senses, and (d) inherent ambiguity in language.

=== Body of the work ===
There are four parts:

- Part I. - of the Principles of Human Existence (Note: In some translations, such as the Penguin classics editions of Descartes' works, this may show up as "The Principles of Human Knowledge".)
- Part II. - of the Principles of Material Things
- Part III. - of the Visible World
- Part IV. - of the Earth.

== Copies and modern editions ==
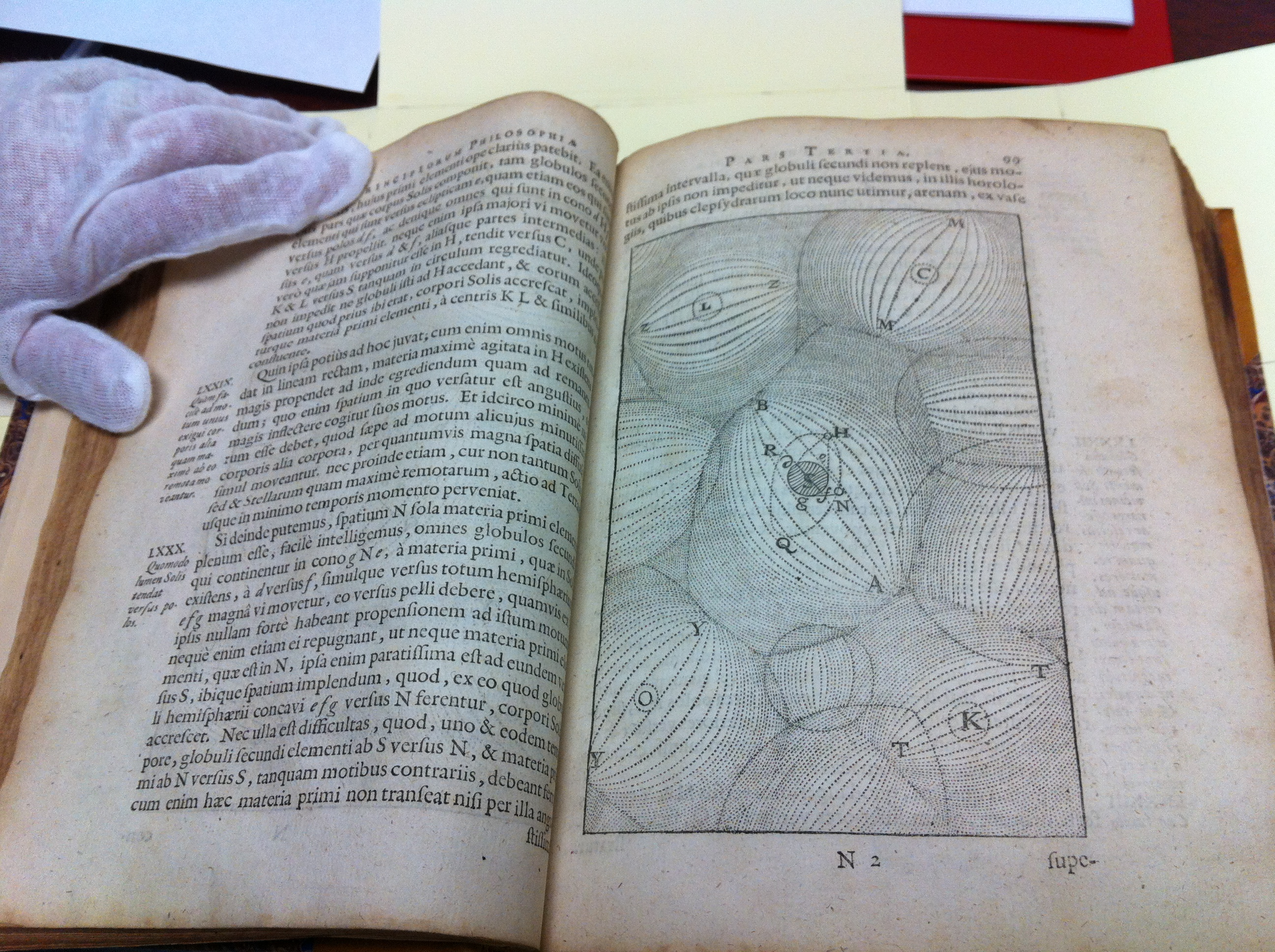
René Descartes' Principia Philosophiae. This copy was printed in 1656, and is owned by Southwest Research Institute rare book collection at the Tom Slick Memorial Library in San Antonio, Texas.

A copy of Descartes' Principia philosophiae dated 1656 is owned by the Tom Slick rare book collection at the Southwest Research Institute in Texas. The book was translated into Italian in 1722 by Giuseppa Eleonora Barbapiccola. (Cf. C. Landolfi, Giuseppa Eleonora Barbapiccola: Opere scelte, Mirista-moderna, Salerno 2024)

D. Reidel, a Dutch publisher, released an English edition of Principia philosophiae in 1983 (ISBN 90-277-1451-7), translated by Valentine Rodger and Reese P. Miller with explanatory notes. Though a translation of the original 1644 Latin work, this edition by Rodger and Miller includes additional material from the 1647 French translation.

== See also ==
- Bucket argument
- Conservation of momentum

Related works

- The World (Descartes)
- Principia philosophiae cartesianae by Baruch Spinoza
