= Principia philosophiae cartesianae =

Work by Baruch Spinoza

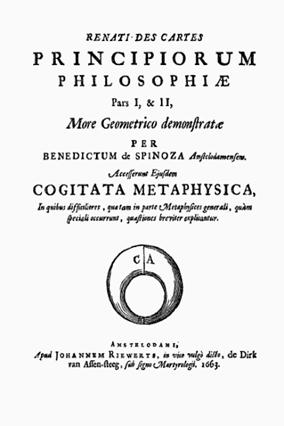
- First edition title page, Published in 1663.
- Author: Benedictus de Spinoza
- Language: Latin

Principia philosophiae cartesianae (PPC; "The Principles of Cartesian Philosophy") or Renati Descartes principia philosophiae, more geometrico demonstrata ("The Principles of René Descartes' Philosophy, Demonstrated in Geometrical Order") is a philosophical work of Baruch Spinoza published in Amsterdam in 1663. In the preface to this work, Ludovic Meyer explains that it is a reconstruction of René Descartes' Principles of Philosophy in the Euclidean or "geometric" fashion. In the appendix, a series of non-geometric prose passages entitled Metaphysical Thoughts [Cogitata Metaphisica], Spinoza explicates Descartes' views on traditional metaphysical topics (including essence, existence, idea, potential, necessity, contingency, duration, and time) while furtively interpolating some of his own.

== English translations ==
Unlike other works by Spinoza (see the corresponding section in that article), this text has only rarely been translated into English.

- 1905 by Halbert Hains Britan, (Open Court Publishing Company).
- 1985 by Edwin Curley, in the first volume of The Collected Works of Spinoza (Princeton University Press).
- 1998 by Samuel Shirley, with an Introduction and notes by Steven Barbone y Lee Rice (Hackett Publications). Later added to the edition of Spinoza's Complete Works in one volume, with introduction and notes by Michael L. Morgan (also Hackett Pbs).
