= Francesco De Grado =

Italian engraver

Quadrupedum Rex, non Leo sed Equus, from Giuseppe d'Alessandro's Pietra Paragone de' cavalieri, Naples, 1711

Francesco De Grado (1663–1733) was an Italian engraver, active in Naples between 1694 and 1730.

== Biography ==
Francesco De Grado was born in Naples in 1663 to a family of Flemish origin. De Grado having signed engravings in over sixty Parthenopean editions between 1694 and 1733. His first recorded works are the fifty-six portraits and frontispiece for Raffaele Maria Filamondo's Il genio bellicoso di Napoli: memorie istoriche di alcuni capitani celebri napoletani (The War Genius of Naples: Historical Memoirs of Some Celebrated Neapolitan Captains), published in Naples in 1694. This lavishly illustrated volume featured designs by Giacomo del Pò and Philipp Schor, the son of the renowned Austrian engraver Johann Paul Schor.

De Grado specialised in prints documenting the ephemeral scenographies, festival machinery (macchine), catafalques, and firework displays commissioned by the Spanish viceroys and the Neapolitan elite during the Habsburg and Bourbon periods. Notable examples of his engraved scenographies and festival apparatuses include the massive outdoor stage celebrating the birthday of Empress Elisabeth Christine of Brunswick-Wolfenbüttel in 1713. This temporary structure was erected in Largo di Palazzo (now Piazza del Plebiscito) in Naples and was designed by the renowned theatre architect Christoph Schor, the younger brother of Philipp. Another notable example is the Veduta della macchina di fuoco artificiale fatta erigere nella piazza di Casandrino per lo giorno di S. Carlo, which illustrates the temporary fireworks machines designed by Michelangelo De Blasio for the Feast of St Charles in 1723. Of particular interest are the engraved illustrations of macchine della Cuccagna (see greasy pole or Cockaigne), the grand, food-laden ephemeral structures built in Naples by De Blasio and Domenico Antonio Vaccaro to celebrate the name day of Elisabeth Christine in 1722 and 1728.

Reconstruction of the interior of the Amphitheatre of Capua from Mazzocchi's In mutilum Campani amphitheatri titulum, Naples, 1727

De Grado also produced topographical and archaeological prints. He engraved Alessio Simmaco Mazzocchi's In mutilum Campani amphitheatri titulum aliasque nonnullas Campanas inscriptiones Commentarius, published in Naples in 1727, which featured designs by Santolo Cirillo, including a depiction of the Amphitheatre of ancient Capua. His two sons, Angelo and Bartolomeo, as well as Bartolomeo's son, Filippo, were also engravers. Bartolomeo supplied engravings for Neapolitan books since about 1730 and would continue to do so in the Bourbon years, most famously for the Breve ragguaglio of Charles Bourbon's wedding in 1738; while Bartolomeo's son Filippo signed engravings in scores of books printed in Naples between 1741 and 1792. Filippo specialized in the engraving of ancient monuments. He was one of the artists selected by the Bourbon King Charles to produce high-quality etchings for the monumental book series Le Antichità di Ercolano Esposte, published between 1757 and 1792. He also engraved the maps of the archaeological sites of Palepolis and Neapolis, designed in 1780 by the engineers and cartographers Carlo Buzzi and Francesco Maresca.

== Bibliography ==
- Abrami Calcagni, Artemisia (1988). "DE GRADO". Dizionario Biografico degli Italiani (in Italian). Vol. 36: De Fornari–Della Fonte. Rome: Institute of the Italian Encyclopaedia. ISBN 978-88-12-00032-6.
- Palmer, Rodney (2008). "Making sense: Neapolitan illustrated books in the European republic of letters". In Livio Pestilli; Ingrid Drake Rowland; Sebastian Schütze (eds.). Napoli è tutto il mondo": Neapolitan art and culture from humanism to the enlightenment. Pisa: Fabrizio Serra Editore. pp. 243–269.
- Reed, Marcia (2015). "Feasting in the Streets: Carnival and the Cuccagna". In Marcia Reed (ed.). The Edible Monument: The Art of Food for Festivals. Los Angeles: Getty Research Institute. pp. 73–100.
