= The World (book) =

Book by René Descartes

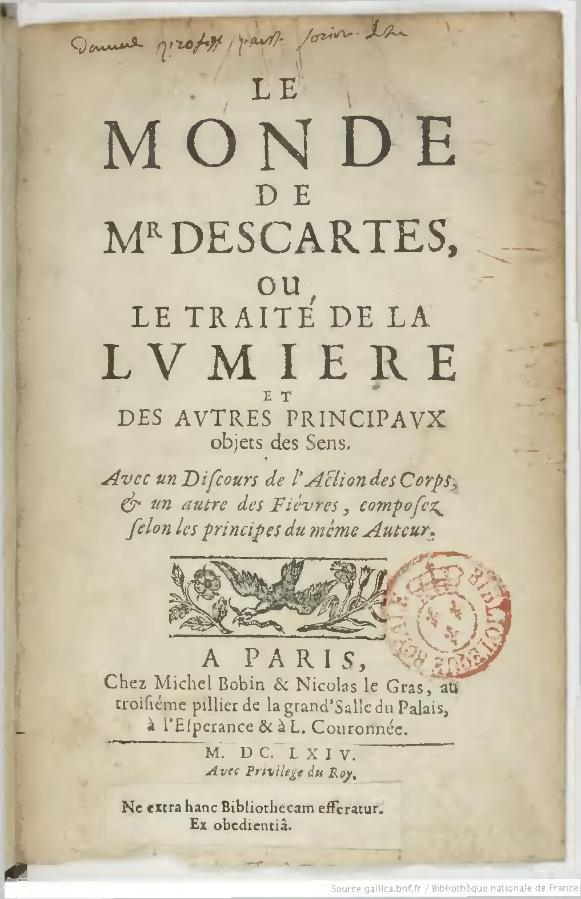
Descartes' Le Monde, 1664

The World, also called Treatise on the Light (French title: Traité du monde et de la lumière), is a book by René Descartes (1596–1650). Written between 1629 and 1633, it contains a nearly complete version of his philosophy, from method, to metaphysics, to physics and biology.

Descartes espoused mechanical philosophy, a form of natural philosophy popular in the 17th century. He thought everything physical in the universe to be made of tiny "corpuscles" of matter. Corpuscularianism is closely related to atomism. The main difference was that Descartes maintained that there could be no vacuum, and all matter was constantly swirling to prevent a void as corpuscles moved through other matter. The World presents a corpuscularian cosmology in which swirling vortices explain, among other phenomena, the creation of the Solar System and the circular motion of planets around the Sun.

The World rests on the heliocentric view, first explicated in Western Europe by Copernicus. Descartes delayed the book's release upon news of the Roman Inquisition's conviction of Galileo for "suspicion of heresy" and sentencing to house arrest. Descartes discussed his work on the book, and his decision not to release it, in letters with another philosopher, Marin Mersenne.

Some material from The World was revised for publication as Principia philosophiae or Principles of Philosophy (1644), a Latin textbook at first intended by Descartes to replace the Aristotelian textbooks then used in universities. In the Principles the heliocentric tone was softened slightly with a relativist frame of reference. The last chapter of The World was published separately as De Homine (On Man) in 1662. The rest of The World was finally published in 1664, and the entire text in 1677.

== Contents of The World ==
1. On the Difference Between our Sensations and the Things That Produce Them
2. In What the Heat and Light of Fire Consists
3. On Hardness and Liquidity
4. On the Void, and How it Happens that Our Senses Are Not Aware of Certain Bodies
5. On the Number of Elements and on Their Qualities
6. Description of a New World, and on the Qualities of the Matter of Which it is Composed
7. On the Laws of Nature of this New World
8. On the Formation of the Sun and the Stars of the New World
9. On the Origin and the Course of the Planets and Comets in General; and of Comets in Particular
10. On the Planets in General, and in Particular on the Earth and Moon
11. On Weight
12. On the Ebb and Flow of the Sea
13. On Light
14. On the Properties of Light
15. That the Face of the Heaven of That New World Must Appear to Its Inhabitants Completely like That of Our World

== The void and particles in nature ==
Before Descartes begins to describe his theories in physics, he introduces the reader to the idea that there is no relationship between our sensations and what creates these sensations, thereby casting doubt on the Aristotelian belief that such a relationship existed. Next he describes how fire is capable of breaking wood apart into its minuscule parts through the rapid motion of the particles of fire within the flames. This rapid motion of particles is what gives fire its heat, since Descartes claims heat is nothing more than just the motion of particles, and what causes it to produce light.

According to Descartes, the motion, or agitation, of these particles is what gives substances their properties (i.e. their fluidity and hardness). Fire is the most fluid and has enough energy to render most other bodies fluid whereas the particles of air lack the force necessary to do the same. Hard bodies have particles that are all equally hard to separate from the whole.

Based on his observations of how resistant nature is to a vacuum, Descartes deduced that all particles in nature are packed together such that there is no void or empty space between them.

Descartes describes substances as consisting only of three elementary elements: fire, air and earth, from which the properties of any substance can be characterized by its composition of these elements, the size and arrangement of the particles in the substance, and the motion of its particles.

== Cartesian laws of motion ==
Descartes asserts several laws governing the motion of these particles and all other objects in nature:

1. “…each particular part of matter always continues in the same state unless collision with others forces it to change its state.”
2. “…when one of these bodies pushes another, it cannot give the 2nd any motion, except by losing as much of its own motion at the same time…”
3. “…when a body is moving…each of its parts individually tends always to continue moving along a straight line” (Gaukroger)

Descartes in Principles of Philosophy added to these his laws on elastic collision. These were largely wrong, and the correct laws of elastic collision were later worked out by Christiaan Huygens.

== The Cartesian universe ==
Descartes elaborates on how the universe could have started from utter chaos and with these basic laws could have had its particles arranged so as to resemble the universe we observe today. Once the particles in the chaotic universe began to move, the overall motion would have been circular because there is no void in nature, so whenever a single particle moves, another particle must also move to occupy the space where the previous particle once was. This type of circular motion, or vortex, would have created what Descartes observed to be the orbits of the planets about the Sun with the heavier objects spinning out towards the outside of the vortex and the lighter objects remaining closer to the center. To explain this, Descartes used the analogy of a river that carried both floating debris (leaves, feathers, etc.) and heavy boats. If the river abruptly arrived at a sharp bend, the boats would follow Descartes third law of motion and hit the shore of the river since the flow of the particles in the river would not have enough force to change the direction of the boat. However, the much lighter floating debris would follow the river since the particles in the river would have sufficient force to change the direction of the debris. In the heavens, it’s the circular flow of celestial particles, or aether, that causes the motion of the planets to be circular.

As to the reason why heavy objects on Earth fall, Descartes explained this through the agitation of the particles in the atmosphere. The particles of the aether have greater agitation than the particles of air, which in turn have greater agitation than the particles that compose terrestrial objects (e.g. stones). The greater agitation of the aether prevents the particles of air from escaping into the heavens, just as the agitation of air particles forces terrestrial bodies, whose particles have far less agitation than those of air, to descend towards the world.

== Cartesian theory on light ==
With his laws of motion set forth and the universe operating under these laws, Descartes next begins to describe his theory on the nature of light. Descartes believed that light traveled instantaneously - a common belief at the time – as an impulse across all the adjacent particles in nature, since Descartes believed nature was without a void. To illustrate this, Descartes used the example of a stick being pushed against some body. Just as the force which is felt at one end of the stick is instantly transferred and felt at the other end, so is the impulse of light that is sent across the heavens and through the atmosphere from luminous bodies to our eyes. Descartes attributed light to have 12 distinct properties:

1. Light extends radially in all direction from luminous bodies
2. Light extends out to any distance
3. Light travels instantaneously
4. Light travels ordinarily in straight lines or rays
5. Several rays can come from different points and meet at the same point
6. Several rays can start at the same point and travel in different directions
7. Several rays can pass through the same point without impeding each other
8. If the rays are of very unequal force, then they can sometimes impede one another

Also:

- 9) and 10) Rays can be diverted by reflection or by refraction
- 11) and 12) The force of a ray can be augmented or diminished by the disposition of the matter that receives it.
