= Analytic philosophy =

20th-century tradition of Western philosophy

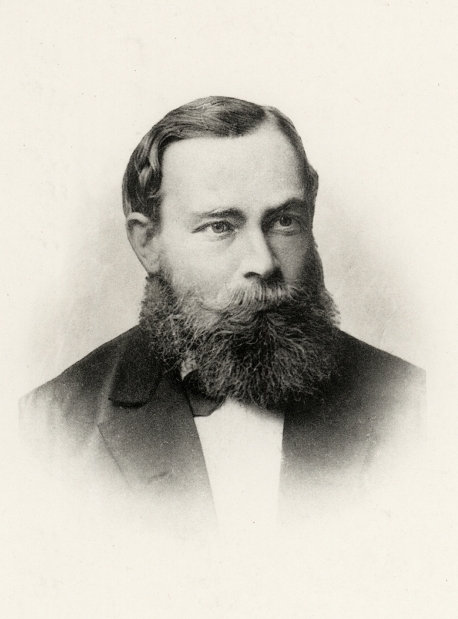
Gottlob Frege

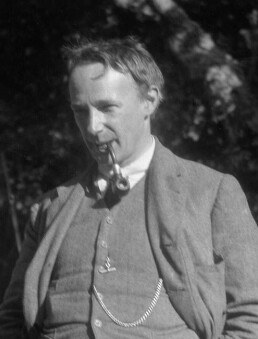
G. E. Moore

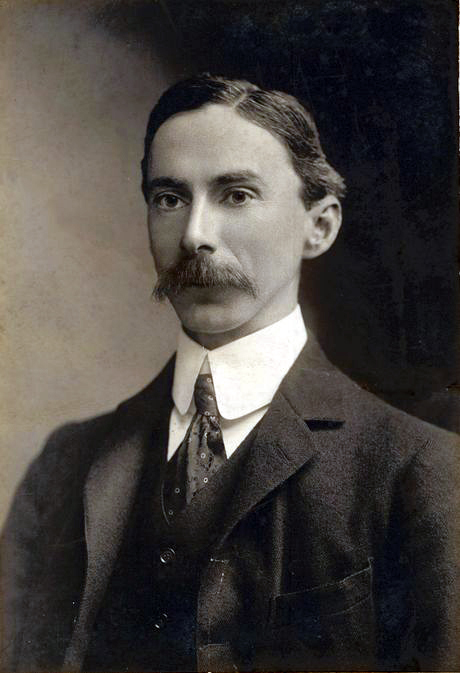
Bertrand Russell

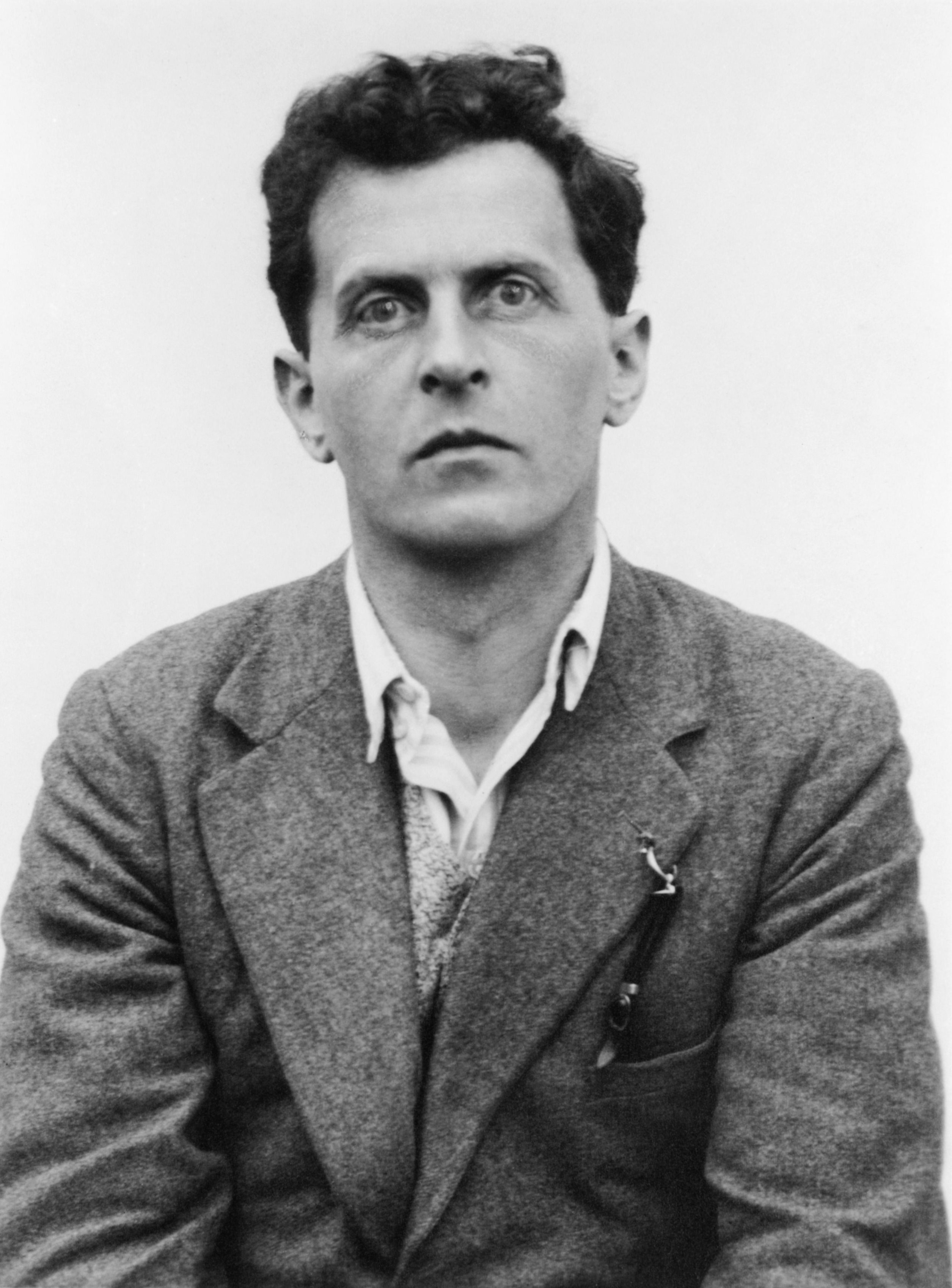
Ludwig Wittgenstein

Analytic philosophy is a broad school of thought or style in contemporary Western philosophy, especially anglophone philosophy, (Note: "Without exception, the best philosophy departments in the United States are dominated by analytic philosophy, and among the leading philosophers in the United States, all but a tiny handful would be classified as analytic philosophers.) with an emphasis on analysis, (Note: A. P. Martinich draws an analogy between analytic philosophy and analytic chemistry, which aims to determine chemical compositions.) clear prose, rigorous arguments, formal logic, mathematics, and the natural sciences (with less emphasis on the humanities). (Note: Sources differ on whether analytic philosophy is a school of thought, or merely a style, or even definable. All emphasize clarity, rigor, and argument. According to Brian Leiter, analytic philosophers "often identify, professionally and intellectually, more closely with the sciences and mathematics, than with the humanities." According to Colin McGinn, "This kind of philosophy is more like science than religion, more like mathematics than poetry—though it is neither science nor mathematics." According to Scott Soames, it "aims at truth and knowledge, as opposed to moral or spiritual improvement [...] the goal in analytic philosophy is to discover what is true, not to provide a useful recipe for living one's life".) It is further characterized by the linguistic turn, or a concern with language and meaning.

Analytic philosophy is often contrasted with continental philosophy, a catch-all term for other methods prominent in continental Europe, (Note: "The distinction (between analytic and continental philosophy) rests upon a confusion of geographical and methodological terms"; "it is like classifying cars into front-wheel drive and Japanese.") most notably existentialism, phenomenology, and Hegelianism. (Note: Steven D. Hales describes the philosophical methods practiced in the West: "[i]n roughly reverse order by number of proponents, they are phenomenology, ideological philosophy, and analytic philosophy".) (Note: The analytic tradition has also been criticized for excessive formalism, ahistoricism, and aloofness towards alternative disciplines and outsiders. Some philosophers have tried to develop a postanalytic philosophy.) The distinction has also been drawn between "analytic" being academic or technical philosophy and "continental" being literary philosophy. (Note: "The distinction...has had many incarnations, from Plato's 'ancient quarrel between poetry and philosophy'...")

The proliferation of analytic philosophy began around the turn of the twentieth century and has been dominant since the second half of the century. Central figures in its history include Gottlob Frege, G. E. Moore, Bertrand Russell, and Ludwig Wittgenstein. Other important figures include the logical positivists (particularly Rudolf Carnap) and the proponents of ordinary language philosophy.

Wilfrid Sellars, W. V. O. Quine, Saul Kripke, David Lewis, and others, led a decline of logical positivism and a subsequent revival in metaphysics. Analytic philosophy has also developed several new branches of philosophy and logic, notably philosophy of language, mathematics, and science, and modern predicate and mathematical logic.

== History ==
The history of analytic philosophy (taken in the narrower sense of "20th-/21st-century analytic philosophy") is usually thought to begin with the rejection of British idealism, a neo-Hegelian movement. But important precursors include the work of Gottlob Frege in formal logic and the philosophy of language, as well as the Austrian tradition associated with Bernard Bolzano, Franz Brentano, Alexius Meinong, and the early Edmund Husserl.

=== Austrian philosophy as a precursor ===
Analytic philosophy was significantly influenced by Austrian realism in the former state of Austria-Hungary, so much so that Michael Dummett has remarked it is better characterized as Anglo-Austrian rather than the usual Anglo-American.

==== Brentano ====
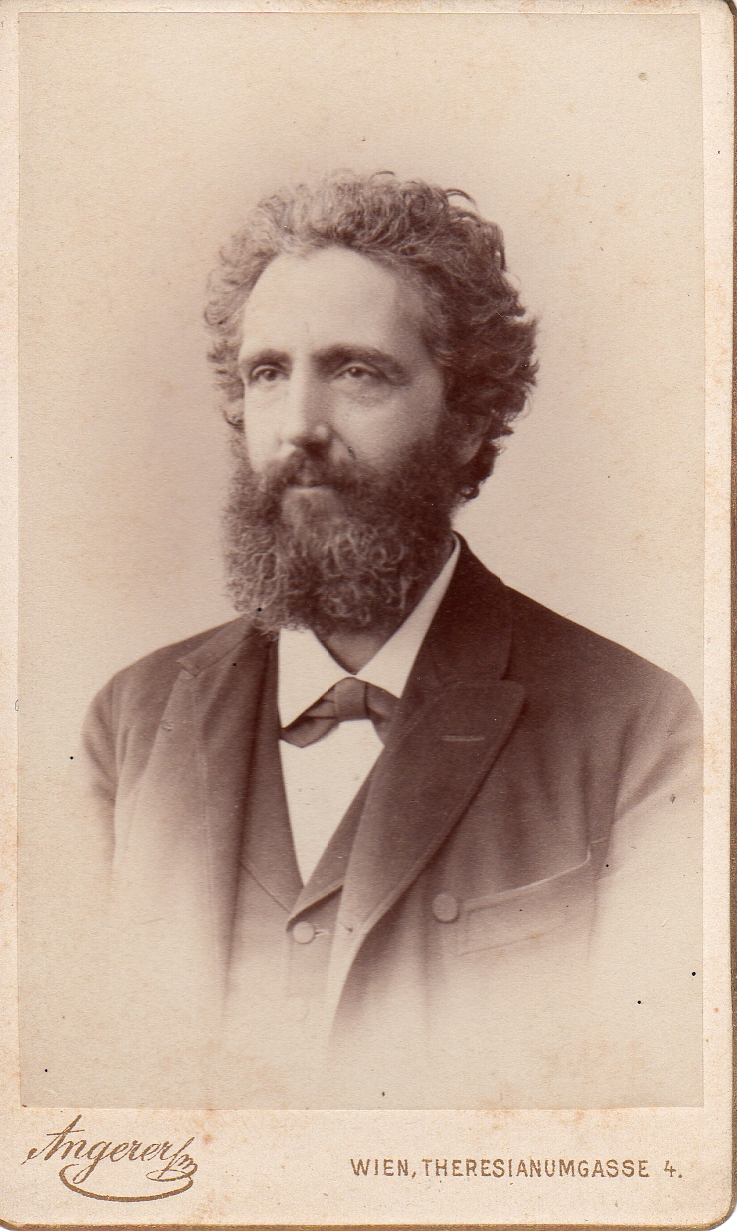
Franz Brentano introduced the problem of intentionality.

In Psychology from an Empirical Standpoint (1874), University of Vienna philosopher and psychologist Franz Brentano gave to philosophy the problem of intentionality, or aboutness. For Brentano, all mental events or acts of consciousness had a real, non-mental intentional object, which the thinking is directed at or "about". Intentionality is "the mark of the mental." Intentionality is to be distinguished from intention or intension.

Every mental phenomenon is characterized by what the Scholastics of the Middle Ages called the intentional (or mental) inexistence of an object, and what we might call, though not wholly unambiguously, reference to a content, direction towards an object (which is not to be understood here as meaning a thing), or immanent objectivity. Every mental phenomenon includes something as object within itself, although they do not all do so in the same way. In presentation something is presented, in judgement something is affirmed or denied, in love loved, in hate hated, in desire desired and so on. This intentional in-existence is characteristic exclusively of mental phenomena. No physical phenomenon exhibits anything like it. We could, therefore, define mental phenomena by saying that they are those phenomena which contain an object intentionally within themselves.

The School of Brentano included Edmund Husserl and Alexius Meinong. Meinong founded the Graz School, and is known for his unique ontology of real, nonexistent objects; a solution to the problem of empty names. This view is known as Meinongianism, or pejoratively as Meinong's jungle. According to Meinong, objects like flying pigs or golden mountains are real and have being, even though they do not exist. The Polish Lwów–Warsaw school, founded by Kazimierz Twardowski, was also influenced by Brentano. Twardowski emphasized "small philosophy", or the detailed, systematic analysis of specific problems. (Note: Analytic philosophy is also characterized by resistance to "imprecise or cavalier discussions of broad topics". Soames states that it is characterized by "a more piecemeal approach. There is, I think, a widespread presumption within the tradition that it is often possible to make philosophical progress by intensively investigating a small, circumscribed range of philosophical issues while holding broader, systematic questions in abeyance".) Twardowski was further influenced by the Bohemian logical realist Bernard Bolzano. (Note: Dummett remarked that Bolzano is analytic philosophy's great-grandfather.)

=== Frege ===
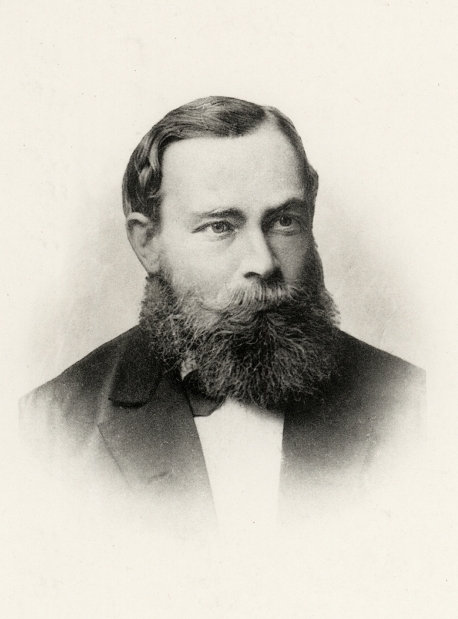
Gottlob Frege, the father of analytic philosophy

Gottlob Frege was a German geometry professor at the University of Jena, logician, and philosopher who is understood as the father of analytic philosophy. He advocated logicism, the project of reducing arithmetic to pure logic, supporting Leibniz and opposing Kant in the philosophy of mathematics.

==== Logic ====
Frege developed modern, mathematical and predicate logic with quantifiers in his book Begriffsschrift (English: Concept-script, 1879). Frege unified the two strains of ancient logic: Aristotelian and Stoic; allowing for a much greater range of sentences to be parsed into logical form. (Note: He has even been accused of plagiarizing the Stoic logic.) An example of this is the problem of multiple generality.

==== Number ====
Neo-Kantianism dominated the late nineteenth century in German philosophy. Husserl's book Philosophie der Arithmetik (1891) argued the concept of a cardinal number derived from mental acts of grouping objects and counting them. In contrast to this "psychologism", Frege, in The Foundations of Arithmetic (1884) and The Basic Laws of Arithmetic (German: Grundgesetze der Arithmetik, 1893–1903), argued that mathematics and logic have their own public objects, independent of one's private judgments or mental states. Following Frege, the logicists tended to advocate a kind of mathematical Platonism.

The modern study of set theory was initiated by the German mathematicians Richard Dedekind and Georg Cantor. Italian mathematician Giuseppe Peano simplified Dedekind's work to systematize mathematics with Peano arithmetic. Frege extended this work in an attempt to reduce arithmetic to logic, developing naive set theory and a set-theoretic definition of natural numbers.

==== Language ====
Frege also proved influential in the philosophy of language. Dummett traces the linguistic turn to Frege's Foundations of Arithmetic and his context principle. Frege writes "never ... ask for the meaning of a word in isolation, but only in the context of a proposition." As Dummett explains, in order to answer a Kantian question, "How are numbers given to us, granted that we have no idea or intuition of them?", Frege finds the solution in defining "the sense of a proposition in which a number word occurs." Thus a problem, traditionally solved along idealist lines, is instead solved along linguistic ones.

===== Sense and reference =====
A triangle of reference illustrating Frege's conception.

Frege's paper "On Sense and Reference" (1892) is seminal, containing Frege's puzzles about identity and advancing a mediated reference theory. Frege points out the reference of "the Morning Star" and "the Evening Star" is the same: both refer to the planet Venus. (Note: The discovery is attributed to Pythagoras by Diogenes Laërtius.) Therefore, substituting one term for the other doesn't change the truth value (salva veritate). However, they differ in what Frege calls cognitive value or the mode of presentation. One has to distinguish between two notions of meaning: the reference of a term and the sense of a term. As Frege points out, "the Morning Star is the Morning Star" is uninformative, but "the Morning Star is the Evening Star" is informative; thus, the two expressions must differ in a way other than reference.

A related puzzle is also known as Frege's puzzle, concerning intensional contexts and propositional attitude reports. Consider the statement "The ancients believed the morning star is the evening star." This statement might be false. However, the statement "The ancients believed the morning star is the morning star" is obviously true. Here again, the morning star and the evening star have different meanings, despite having the same reference.

In Frege's paper "On Concept and Object" (1892) he distinguishes between a concept which is the reference of a predicate, (Note: Paradoxically, according to Frege's theory, "the concept horse" is an object, not a concept.) and an object which is the reference of a proper name. (Note: For whole sentences, their reference is the object "the True" or "the False".)

===== Thought =====
A diagram of the "three realms"

The paper "The Thought: A Logical Inquiry" (1918) reflects Frege's anti-idealism. He argues for a Platonist account of propositions or thoughts. Frege claims propositions are intangible, like ideas; yet publicly available, like an object. In addition to the physical, public "first realm" of objects and the private, mental "second realm" of ideas, Frege posits a "third realm" of Platonic propositions, such as the Pythagorean theorem.

=== Revolt against British idealism ===
British philosophy in the nineteenth century saw a revival of logic started by Richard Whately, in reaction to the anti-logical aspects of British empiricism. The major figure of this period is mathematician George Boole. Other figures include Scottish metaphysician William Hamilton, mathematician and laws namesake Augustus De Morgan, economist William Stanley Jevons, diagram namesake John Venn, Alice's Adventures in Wonderland author Lewis Carroll, (Note: A famous paper on logic by Carroll is "What the Tortoise Said to Achilles".) Scottish mathematician Hugh MacColl, and American pragmatist Charles Sanders Peirce.

However, British philosophy in the late nineteenth century was dominated by British idealism, a neo-Hegelian movement, as taught by philosophers such as F. H. Bradley and T. H. Green. Bradley's work Appearance and Reality (1893) exemplified the school.

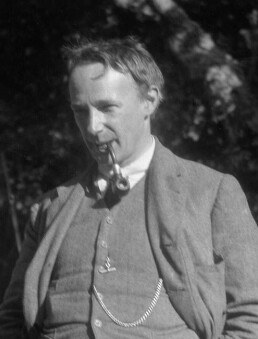
G. E. Moore led the revolt against idealism.

Analytic philosophy in the narrower sense of twentieth-century anglophone philosophy is usually thought to begin with Cambridge philosophers Bertrand Russell and G. E. Moore's rejection of Hegelianism for being obscure; or the "revolt against idealism." (Note: "Analytic philosophy opposed right from its beginning English neo-Hegelianism of Bradley's sort and similar ones. It did not only criticize the latter's denial of the existence of an external world (anyway an unjust criticism), but also the bombastic, obscure style of Hegel's writings.") Russell summed up Moore's common sense influence: (Note: see also Moore's "A Defence of Common Sense".)

"G. E. Moore...took the lead in rebellion, and I followed, with a sense of emancipation. Bradley had argued that everything common sense believes in is mere appearance; we reverted to the opposite extreme, and that everything is real that common sense, uninfluenced by philosophy or theology, supposes real. With a sense of escaping from prison, we allowed ourselves to think that grass is green, that the sun and stars would exist if no one was aware of them, and also that there is a pluralistic timeless world of Platonic ideas."

Russell and Moore contributed to the philosophy of perception with a naïve realism and sense-data theory. In America, George Santayana and the New Realists opposed idealism and its egocentric predicament.

==== Logical atomism ====
An important aspect of Hegelianism and British idealism was logical holism—the belief that aspects of the world can be known only by knowing the whole world. This is closely related to the doctrine of internal relations, the belief that relations between items are internal relations, or essential properties the items have by nature. Russell and Moore in response promulgated logical atomism and the doctrine of external relations—the belief that the world consists of independent facts. (Note: Russell once explained, "Hegel had maintained that all separateness is illusory and that the universe is more like a pot of treacle than a heap of shot. I therefore said, "The universe is exactly like a heap of shot."')

=== Russell ===
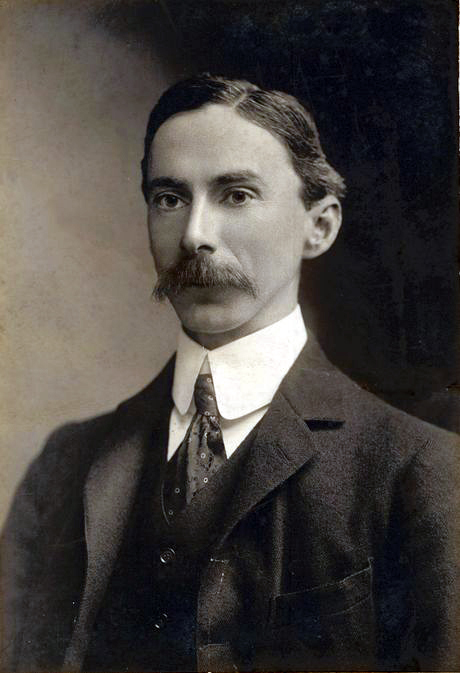
Bertrand Russell in 1907

In 1901, Russell famously discovered the paradox in Basic Law V (also known as unrestricted comprehension), which undermined Frege's set theory. However, Russell was still a logicist, and in The Principles of Mathematics (1903), he also argued for Meinongianism.

==== Theory of descriptions ====
During his early career, Russell adopted Frege's predicate logic as his primary philosophical method, thinking it could expose the underlying structure of philosophical problems. This was done most famously in his theory of definite descriptions in "On Denoting", published in Mind in 1905. The essay has been called a "paradigm of philosophy."

In this essay, Russell responds to both Meinong and Frege. Russell uses his analysis of descriptions to solve ascriptions of nonexistence, such as with "the present King of France". He argues all proper names (aside from demonstratives like this or that) are disguised definite descriptions; for example, "Walter Scott" can be replaced with "the author of Waverley". (Note: The Waverley novels were not acknowledged by Scott and penned anonymously saying only "by the author of Waverley" on the title page.) This position came to be called descriptivism.

Russell presents his own version of Frege's second puzzle.

"If a is identical with b, whatever is true of the one is true of the other, and either may be substituted for the other without altering the truth or falsehood of that proposition. Now George IV wished to know whether Scott was the author of Waverley; and in fact Scott was the author of Waverley. Hence we may substitute “Scott” for “the author of Waverley” and thereby prove that George IV wished to know whether Scott was Scott. Yet an interest in the law of identity can hardly be attributed to the first gentleman of Europe.”

The essay also illustrates the concept of scope ambiguity by showing how denying "The present King of France is bald" can mean either "There is no King of France" or "The present King of France is not bald". Russell quips "Hegelians, who love a synthesis, will probably conclude that he wears a wig." For Russell, there was knowledge by description and, from sense-data theory, knowledge by acquaintance.

==== Principia Mathematica ====
Russell's book written with Alfred North Whitehead, Principia Mathematica (1910–1913), was the seminal text of classical logic and of the logicist project, and encouraged many philosophers to renew their interest in symbolic logic. It used a notation from Peano, and a theory of types to avoid the pitfalls of Russell's paradox. Whitehead developed process metaphysics in Process and Reality (1929).

==== Ideal language ====
Russell claimed the problems of philosophy can be solved by showing the simple constituents of complex notions. Logical form would be made clear by syntax. For example, the English word is has three distinct meanings, which predicate logic can express as follows:

- For the sentence 'the cat is asleep', the is of predication means that "x is P" (denoted as P(x)).
- For the sentence 'there is a cat', the is of existence means that "there is an x" (∃x).
- For the sentence 'three is half of six', the is of identity means that "x is the same as y" (x=y).

From about 1910 to 1930, analytic philosophers emphasized creating an ideal language for philosophical analysis, which would be free from the ambiguities of ordinary language that, in their opinion, often led philosophers astray.

=== Early Wittgenstein ===
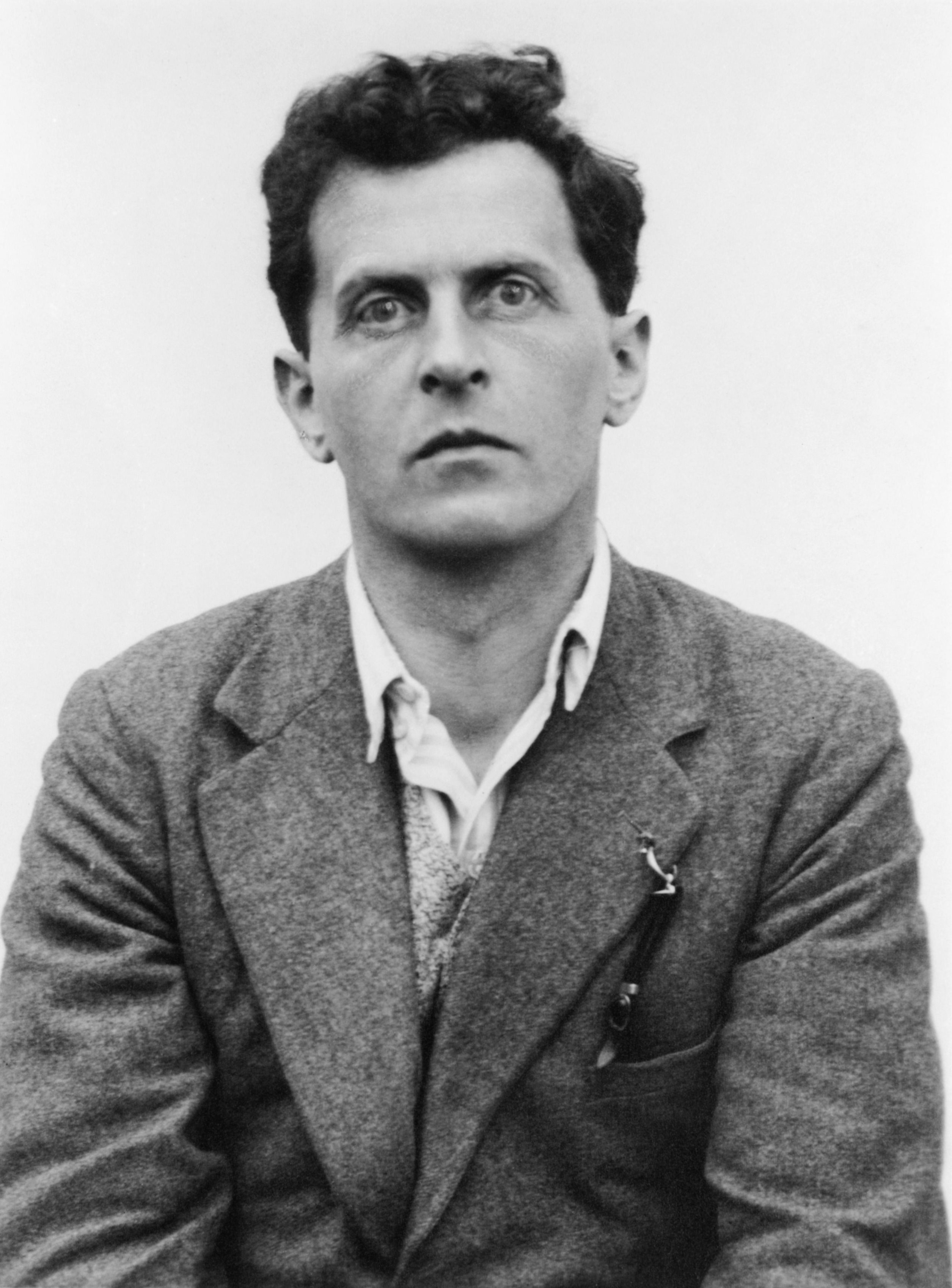
Ludwig Wittgenstein

Russell's student Ludwig Wittgenstein developed a comprehensive system of logical atomism, with a picture theory of meaning, in his Tractatus Logico-Philosophicus (German: Logisch-Philosophische Abhandlung, 1921), sometimes known as simply the Tractatus. (Note: The Latin title was suggested by Moore as an homage to Baruch Spinoza's Tractatus Theologico-Politicus (1670).) Wittgenstein thought he had solved all the problems of philosophy with the Tractatus.

The book starts, "The world is all that is the case." Wittgenstein claims the universe is the totality of actual states of affairs and that these states of affairs can be expressed and mirrored by the language of first-order predicate logic. Thus, a picture of the universe can be constructed by expressing facts in the form of atomic propositions and linking them using logical operators.

The Tractatus introduced philosophers to the terms tautology, truth conditions, and to the truth table method. Wittgenstein believed tautologies or logical truths say nothing, but show the logical structure of the world, and has been labeled a mystic who believed in the ineffable by some readers. The Tractatus further ultimately concludes that all of its propositions are meaningless, illustrated with a ladder one must toss away after climbing up it. The book ends, "Whereof one cannot speak, thereof one must be silent."

=== Logical positivism ===
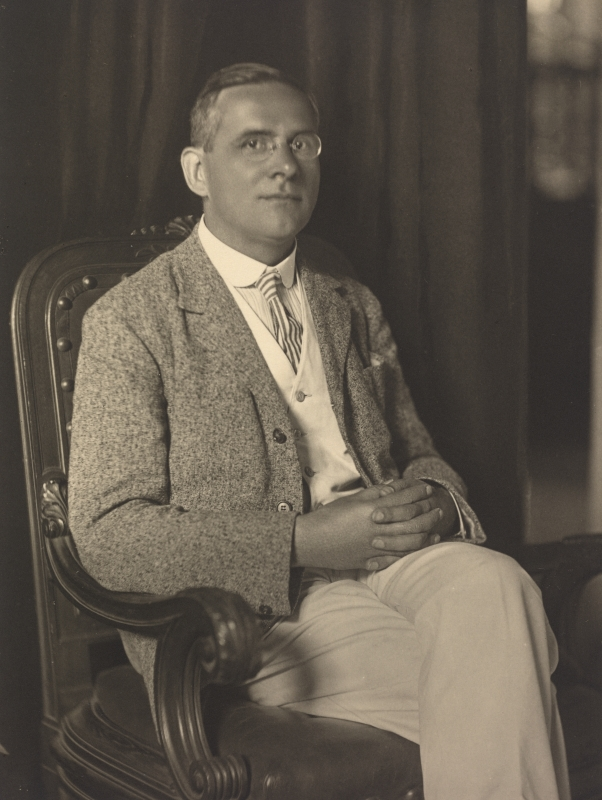
Moritz Schlick

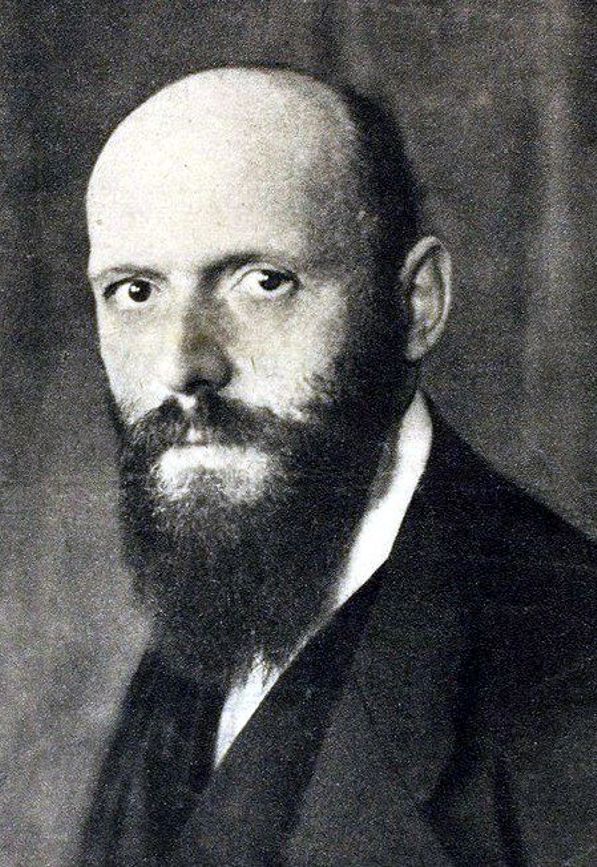
Otto Neurath

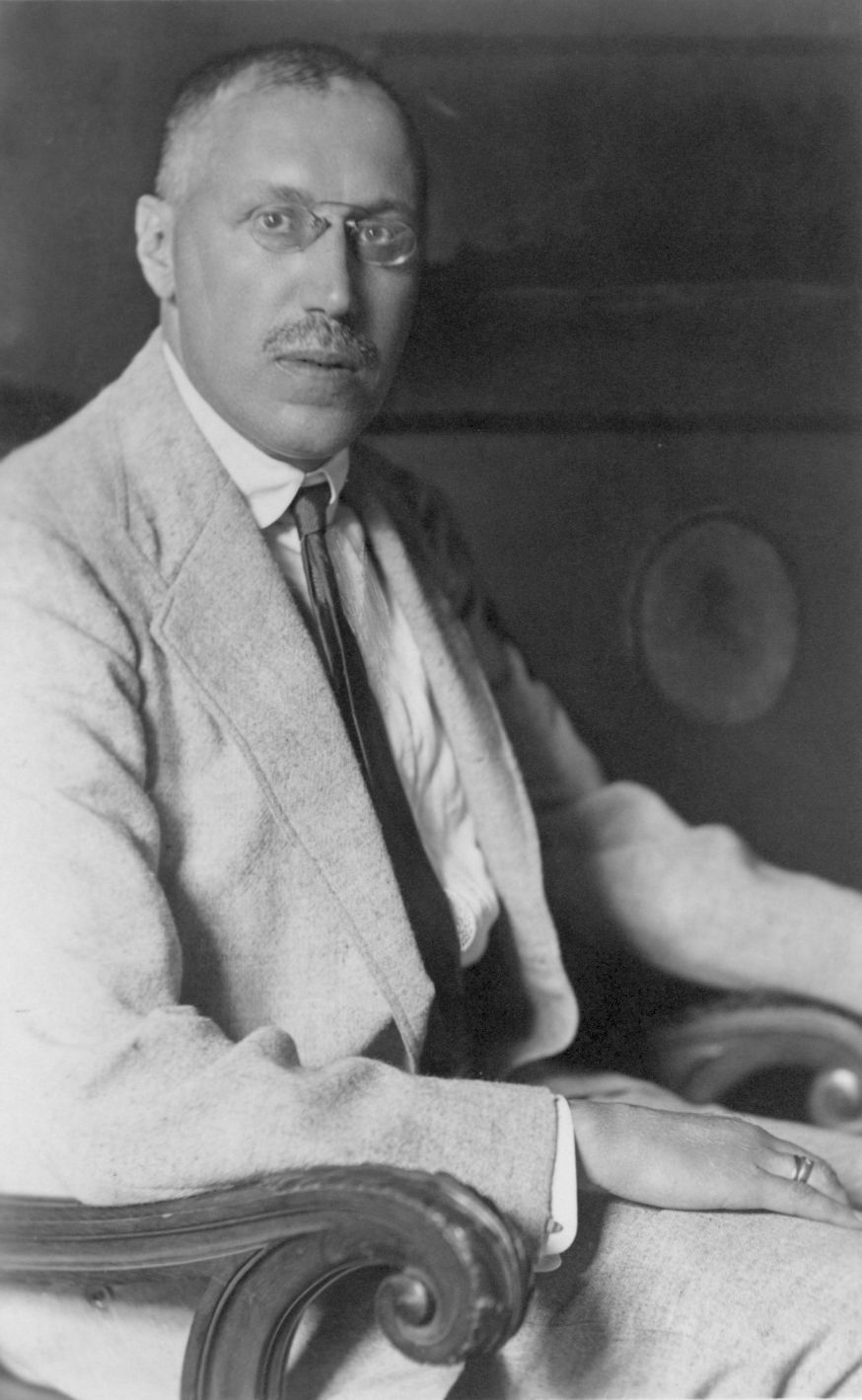
Hans Hahn

Rudolf Carnap

Members of the Vienna Circle

During the late 1920s to 1940s, two groups of philosophers known as the Vienna Circle and the Berlin Circle developed Russell and Wittgenstein's philosophy into a doctrine known as "logical positivism" (or "logical empiricism"). The Vienna Circle (previously the Ernst Mach Society) was led by Moritz Schlick and included Rudolf Carnap and Otto Neurath. The Berlin Circle was led by Hans Reichenbach and included Carl Hempel and mathematician David Hilbert. There was also the Dutch signific circle, which included L. E. J. Brouwer, founder of intuitionistic logic.

Logical positivists used formal logical methods to develop an empiricist account of knowledge. They adopted the verification principle, according to which every meaningful statement is either analytic or synthetic. The truths of logic and mathematics were tautologies, and those of science were verifiable empirical claims. These two constituted the entire universe of meaningful judgments; anything else was nonsense. Thus the principle rejected statements of metaphysics, theology, ethics, and aesthetics as cognitively meaningless.

The logical positivists saw their verificationism as a recapitulation of a quote by David Hume, the closing lines from An Enquiry Concerning Human Understanding (1748):

If we take in our hand any volume; of divinity or school metaphysics, for instance; let us ask, Does it contain any abstract reasoning concerning quantity or number? No. Does it contain any experimental reasoning concerning matter of fact and existence? No. Commit it then to the flames: for it can contain nothing but sophistry and illusion.

This led the logical positivists to reject many traditional problems of philosophy. They typically considered philosophy to have a minimal function, concerning the clarification of thoughts, rather than having a distinct subject matter of its own.

Epistemology was still discussed. Schlick was a foundationalist, believing knowledge was like a pyramid, built on prior layers of knowledge except for the first layer. Neurath was an anti-foundationalist, coherentist who famously gave the analogy of reconstructing a ship while on the open sea.

Friedrich Waismann introduced the concept of open texture to describe the universal possibility of vagueness in empirical statements. Waismann never finished a book titled Logik, Sprache, Philosophie intended to present the ideas of logical positivism to a wider audience.

Carnap and Reichenbach started the journal Erkenntnis. Carnap advocated solving problems by "semantic ascent", talking about language instead of its objects. Carnap also distinguished between trivial internal questions and meaningless external questions. He is best known for works like Der logische Aufbau der Welt (translated as The Logical Structure of the World, 1967) and The Elimination of Metaphysics Through Logical Analysis of Language (1959). (Note: Carnap famously criticized the continental philosopher Heidegger for saying "the nothing noths".)

Several logical positivists were Jewish, such as Neurath, Waismann, Hans Hahn, and Reichenbach. Others, like Carnap, were gentiles but socialists or pacifists. With the coming to power of Adolf Hitler and Nazism in 1933, many members of the Vienna and Berlin Circles fled to Britain and the United States, which helped to reinforce the dominance of logical positivism and analytic philosophy in anglophone countries.

In 1936, Schlick was murdered in Vienna by his former student, Hans Nelböck. The same year, A. J. Ayer's work Language, Truth and Logic introduced the English speaking world to logical positivism.

=== Ordinary language ===
After World War II, analytic philosophy became interested in ordinary language philosophy, in contrast to ideal language philosophy. Rather than rely on logical constructions, philosophers emphasized the use of natural language. There were two strains of ordinary language philosophy: the later Wittgenstein and Oxford philosophies.

==== Later Wittgenstein ====
Wittgenstein's later philosophy, from the posthumous Philosophical Investigations (1953), differed dramatically from his early work of the Tractatus. Philosophers refer to them like two different philosophers: "early Wittgenstein" and "later Wittgenstein". One notion found in both early and later Wittgenstein is that "Philosophy is a battle against the bewitchment of our intelligence by means of language." Philosophers had been misusing language and asking meaningless questions, and it was Wittgenstein's job "to show the fly the way out of the fly bottle."

===== Ramsey =====
The criticisms of Frank Ramsey on the "color-exclusion problem" led to some of Wittgenstein's first doubts with regard to his early philosophy. Wittgenstein in the Tractatus thought the only necessity is logical necessity; yet that no point in space can have two different colors at the same time seems a necessary truth but not a logical one. Wittgenstein responded to Ramsey in "Some Remarks on Logical Form" (1929), the only academic paper he ever published. Ramsey died of jaundice the next year at the age of 26.

===== Sraffa's gesture =====
Norman Malcolm also famously credits Piero Sraffa for providing Wittgenstein with the conceptual break from his earlier philosophy, by means of a rude gesture:

Wittgenstein was insisting that a proposition and what it describes must have the same 'logical form', the same 'logical multiplicity'. Sraffa made a gesture, familiar to Neapolitans as meaning something like disgust or contempt, of brushing the underneath of his chin with an outward sweep of the fingertips of one hand. And he asked: 'What is the logical form of that?'

Prior to the publication of the Philosophical Investigations, philosophers like John Wisdom and Rush Rhees were some of the few sources of information about Wittgenstein's later philosophy. Wisdom's 1936 essay "Philosophical Perplexity" was described by J. O. Urmson as the first article "which throughout embodied the new philosophical outlook, it is something of a landmark in the history of philosophy." (Note: Wisdom wrote "If I were asked to answer, in one sentence, the question 'What was Wittgenstein's biggest contribution to philosophy', I should answer 'His asking of the question "Can one play chess without the Queen?"') (Note: The first recorded use of the term "analytic philosophers" occurred in Wisdom's 1931 work, "Interpretation and Analysis in Relation to Bentham's Theory of Definition", which expounded on Bentham's concept of "paraphrasis": "that sort of exposition which may be afforded by transmuting into a proposition, having for its subject some real entity, a proposition which has not for its subject any other than a fictitious entity". According to Michael Beaney, "the explicit articulation of the idea of paraphrasis in the work of both Wisdom in Cambridge and Ryle in Oxford represents a definite stage in the construction of analytic philosophy as a tradition".) Another work of Wisdom's was Other Minds (1952) which discusses the problem of other minds.

The later Wittgenstein develops a therapeutic approach. He introduces the concept of a "language-game" as a "form of life". By "language-game", he meant a language simpler than an entire language. Wittgenstein argued that a word or sentence has meaning only as a result of the "rule" of the "game" being played. Depending on the context, for example, the utterance "Water!" could be an order, the answer to a question, or some other form of communication. Rather than his prior picture theory of meaning, the later Wittgenstein advocates a theory of meaning as use, according to which words are defined by how they are used within the language-game.

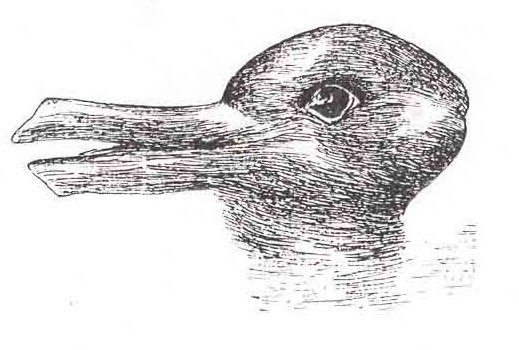
The duck-rabbit illusion became famous when Wittgenstein used it to distinguish "seeing that" from "seeing as".

The notion of family resemblance thinks things thought to be connected by one essential, common feature may in fact be connected by a series of overlapping similarities, where no one feature is common to all of them. Games, which Wittgenstein used as an example to explain the notion, have become the classic example of a group that is related by family resemblance.

Philosophical Investigations also contains the private language argument. Another point Wittgenstein makes against the possibility of a private language involves the beetle-in-a-box thought experiment. He asks the reader to imagine that each person has a box, inside which is something that everyone intends to refer to with the word beetle. Further, suppose that no one can look inside another's box. Under such a situation, Wittgenstein says the word beetle is meaningless.

He also famously uses the duck-rabbit, an ambiguous image, as a means of describing two different ways of seeing: "seeing that" versus "seeing as".

=== Oxford philosophy ===
The other trend of ordinary language philosophy was known as "Oxford philosophy", in contrast to the earlier analytic Cambridge philosophers. Influenced by Moore's common sense and the later Wittgenstein's quietism, the Oxford philosophers claimed ordinary language already represented many subtle distinctions not recognized in traditional philosophy. The most prominent Oxford philosophers were Gilbert Ryle, Peter Strawson, and John L. Austin.

==== Ryle ====
Ryle, in The Concept of Mind (1949), criticized Cartesian dualism, arguing in favor of disposing of "Descartes' myth" of the ghost in the machine by recognizing "category errors". Ryle sees Descartes' error as similar to saying one sees the campus, buildings, faculty, students, and so on, but still goes on to ask "Where is the university?"

==== Strawson ====
Strawson first became well known with his article "On Referring" (1950), a criticism of Russell's theory of descriptions. On Strawson's account, the use of a description presupposes the existence of the object fitting the description. In his book Individuals (1959), Strawson examines our conceptions of basic particulars.

==== Austin ====
Austin, in the posthumously published How to Do Things with Words (1962), articulated the theory of speech acts and emphasized the ability of words to do things (e.g. "I promise") and not just say things. This influenced several fields to undertake what is called a performative turn. In Sense and Sensibilia (1962), Austin criticized sense-data theories.

=== Spread to other countries ===
==== Australia and New Zealand ====
Samuel Alexander's realism influenced Australian philosophy. The school known as Australian realism began when John Anderson accepted the Challis Chair of Philosophy at the University of Sydney in 1927. (Note: John's elder brother was William Anderson, Professor of Philosophy at Auckland University College from 1921 to his death in 1955, who was described as "the most dominant figure in New Zealand philosophy.") American philosopher David Lewis later became closely associated with Australia, whose philosophical community he visited almost annually for more than 30 years. In New Zealand, South African J. N. Findlay, a student of Austrian realist Ernst Mally, taught at the University of Otago. Karl Popper lectured at the Canterbury University College in Christchurch.

==== Sweden and Finland ====
In Sweden, Axel Hägerström broke away from Christopher Jacob Boström's idealism, founding the Uppsala School of Philosophy. The Finnish philosopher Eino Kaila is considered to have founded Finnish analytic philosophy. Kaila's student Georg Henrik von Wright succeeded Wittgenstein at Cambridge in 1948.

==== China ====
Chinese philosopher Zhang Shenfu first introduced Russell's ideas to China, and later translated the Tractatus. In 1920, Russell visited China at the invitation of Liang Qichao. (Note: Pragmatist John Dewey was visiting China at the same time.) This begins the first phase of analytic philosophy in China. Tscha Hung then introduced logical positivism to China with The Philosophy of the Vienna Circle (1945). During the second phase, scholars such as Jin Yuelin and Hong Qian spread analytic philosophy, until Communist political pressure sidelined research. (Note: Communist ideology claimed to have won "an absolute victory" over analytic philosophy, as well as traditional Chinese philosophy.)

After the reform and opening up of the 1970s, analytic philosophy in China is now in its third phase, and is an active and growing area of study. (Note: In 2024, the School of Philosophy at Shanxi University launched the Center for Analytic Chinese Philosophy. The center held both the first philosophical forum on analytic Chinese philosophy, and the first international conference on the history of analytic Chinese philosophy in the twentieth century.)

== Metaphysics ==
During the second half of the twentieth century, analytic philosophy saw the demise of logical positivism and a revival of metaphysical theorizing.

=== Sellars ===
Kant scholar Wilfrid Sellars, the son of Roy Wood Sellars, "revolutionized both the content and the method of philosophy in the United States". Sellars's criticism of the "Myth of the Given", in Empiricism and the Philosophy of Mind (1956), challenged logical positivism by arguing against sense-data theories and knowledge by acquaintance. In his "Philosophy and the Scientific Image of Man" (1962), Sellars's critical realism distinguishes between the "manifest image" and the "scientific image" of the world. Sellars's goal of a synoptic philosophy uniting the everyday and scientific views of reality is the basis of what is sometimes called the Pittsburgh School, whose members include Robert Brandom, John McDowell, and John Haugeland.

=== Quine ===
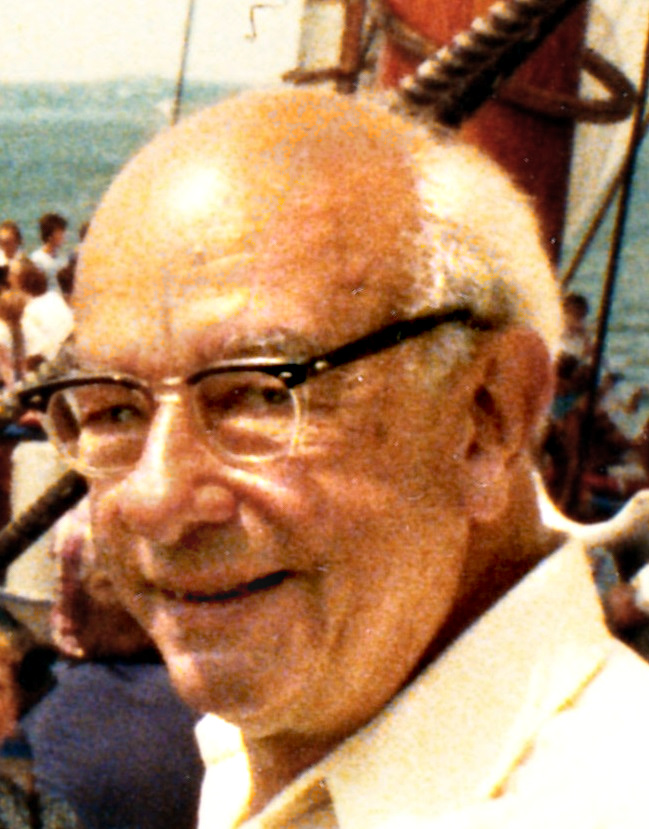
W. V. O. Quine helped to undermine logical positivism.

Harvard philosopher W. V. O. Quine shaped much of subsequent philosophy and is recognized as "one of the most influential philosophers of the twentieth century". He is regularly cited as the greatest philosopher of the second half of the twentieth century, or the next great philosopher after Wittgenstein.

Quine was a student of Carnap. He was an empiricist who sought to naturalize philosophy and saw philosophy as continuous with science, distinguished only by philosophy being the most general science. However, Quine doubted usual theories of meaning, and, instead of logical positivism, advocated a kind of semantic holism and ontological relativity, which explained that every term in any statement has its meaning contingent on a vast network of knowledge and belief, the speaker's conception of the entire world.

==== Word and Object ====
In his magnum opus Word and Object (1960), Quine introduces the idea of radical translation, an introduction to his theory of the indeterminacy of translation, and specifically to prove the inscrutability of reference. The gavagai thought experiment tells about a linguist, who tries to find out what the expression gavagai means when uttered by a speaker of a yet-unknown native language upon seeing a rabbit. At first glance, it seems that gavagai simply translates with rabbit. Quine points out there is no way to tell that the speaker did not mean, for instance, "undetached rabbit-part" (such as its ear) as well as several other scenarios.

==== On What There Is ====
Quine's essay on ontology, "On What There Is" (1948) elucidates Russell's theory of descriptions. Quine uses Pegasus instead of "the present King of France" and dubs the problem of nonexistence Plato's beard. The essay contains Quine's famous dictum of ontological commitment, "To be is to be the value of a variable". One is committed to the entities his theory posits by use of the existential quantifier, like "There are some so-and-sos". Other parts of speech do not commit one to entities and so for Quine are syncategorematic.

==== Two Dogmas of Empiricism ====
Also among the developments that resulted in the decline of logical positivism and the revival of metaphysics was Quine's attack on the analytic–synthetic distinction in "Two Dogmas of Empiricism" (1951), published in The Philosophical Review, a paper "sometimes regarded as the most important in all of twentieth-century philosophy". (Note: On What There Is and Two Dogmas of Empiricism were republished in Quine's book From A Logical Point of View (1953).) The paper made Quine the most dominant philosopher in America before Kripke.

=== Kripke ===
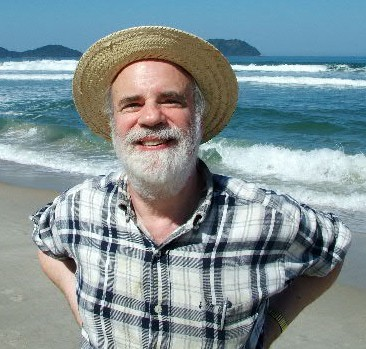
Saul Kripke helped to revive interest in metaphysics among analytic philosophers.

Saul Kripke is widely regarded as having revived theories of essence and identity as respectable topics of philosophical discussion. He was influential in arguing that flaws in common theories of descriptions and proper names are indicative of larger misunderstandings of the metaphysics of modality, or of necessity and possibility.

Modal logic was developed by pragmatist C. I. Lewis to deal with the paradoxes of material implication. Carnap also contributed to modal logic with works like Meaning and Necessity (1947). Ruth Barcan Marcus introduced the now standard "box" operator for necessity and "diamond" operator for possibility in her treatment of the Barcan formula. Kripke provided a semantics for modal logic; he and Barcan both argued identity is a necessary relation.

==== Naming and Necessity ====
Especially important was Kripke's book Naming and Necessity (1980). According to one author, Naming and Necessity "played a large role in the implicit, but widespread, rejection of the view—so popular among ordinary language philosophers—that philosophy is nothing more than the analysis of language." Kripke argued proper names are rigid designators, or designate the same thing in all possible worlds, unlike descriptions. For example, an election may have turned out differently, so the description "winner of the 1968 US presidential election" might have designated Hubert Humphrey instead of Richard Nixon. However, the name "Richard Nixon" designates the man Richard Nixon, regardless of the election results.

Kant stated in the Critique of Pure Reason (1781) that necessity is the criterion for a priori knowledge. Kripke argued that necessity is a metaphysical notion distinct from the epistemic notion of a priori, and that there are necessary truths that are known a posteriori, such as that water is H_{2}O, or gold is atomic number 79. Kripke and Quine's colleague Hilary Putnam argued for realism about natural kinds. Putnam's Twin Earth thought experiment is used to argue water is a natural kind.

=== David Lewis ===
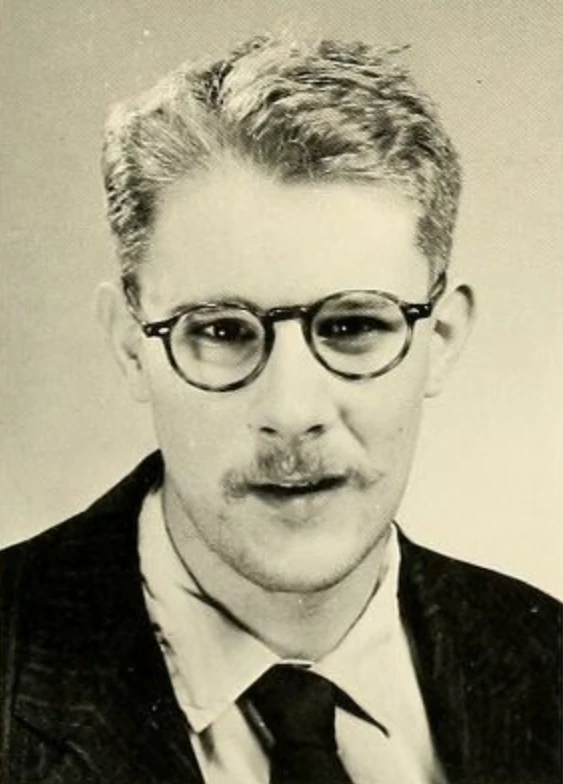
David Lewis

David Lewis defended a number of elaborate metaphysical theories. In works such as On the Plurality of Worlds (1986) and Counterfactuals (1973), Lewis argued for modal realism and counterpart theory – the belief in real, concrete possible worlds, and argued against any "ersatz" conception of possibility. According to Lewis, "actual" is merely an indexical label we give a world when we are in it. Lewis applied Quine's dictum of ontological commitment to the statement "There are other ways things could have been;" committing Lewis (by his lights) to the real existence of other ways things could have been. He also defended what he called Humean supervenience, and a counterfactual theory of causation, another view of Hume's.

=== Truth ===
Frege questioned standard theories of truth, and sometimes advocated a deflationary, redundancy theory of truth, i. e. that the predicate "is true" does not express anything above and beyond the statement to which it is attributed. Frank Ramsey also advocated a redundancy theory.

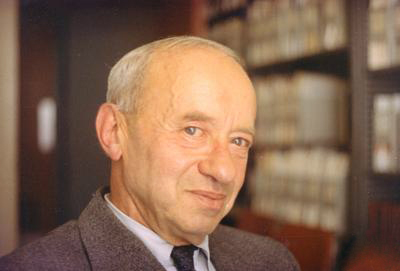
Alfred Tarski has an influential theory of truth.

Alfred Tarski put forward an influential semantic theory of truth, that truth is a property of sentences. Tarski's semantic methods culminated in model theory, as opposed to proof theory.

In Truth-Makers (1984), Kevin Mulligan, Peter Simons, and Barry Smith introduced the truth-maker idea as a contribution to the correspondence theory of truth. A truth-maker is contrasted with a truth-bearer. A truth-bearer's truth is grounded by the truth-maker.

=== Universals ===
In response to the problem of universals, Australian David Armstrong defended a kind of moderate realism. David Lewis and Anthony Quinton defended nominalism.

=== Mereology ===
Polish philosopher Stanisław Leśniewski, along with Nelson Goodman, established mereology, the formal study of parts and wholes. Mereology was originally a variant of nominalism arguing one should dispense with set theory, but the now broader subject of parts and wholes arguably goes back to the time of the pre-Socratics.

David Lewis introduced the term 'atomless gunk' for something not made up of simples, which instead divides forever into smaller and smaller parts. Peter Van Inwagen believes in mereological nihilism, except for living beings, a view called organicism. According to mereological nihilism, there are no (say) chairs, just fundamental particles arranged chair-wise.

=== Personal identity ===
Since John Locke's An Essay Concerning Human Understanding (1690), philosophers have been concerned with the problem of personal identity. (Note: Problems of personal identity are analogous to the Ship of Theseus and talks of identity going back even further.) Locke thought psychological continuity or memory made one the same person over time. Bernard Williams in The Self and the Future (1970) takes the opposite view, and argues that personal identity is bodily identity rather than mental continuity.

Derek Parfit in Reasons and Persons (1984) defends a kind of bundle theory of personal identity. Parfit issues several thought experiments including teleportation, and cases of fission, where one person splits into two, say surviving with half of their brain, while the other half is put into a new body. David Lewis defends perdurantism, where people are four-dimensional, so a person at any one time is only a part or slice of the whole person.

=== Free will and determinism ===
Peter van Inwagen's monograph An Essay on Free Will (1983) played an important role in rehabilitating libertarianism, with respect to free will, in mainstream analytic philosophy. He introduces the consequence argument and the term incompatibilism about free will and determinism, to stand in contrast to compatibilism—the view that free will is compatible with determinism. Charlie Broad had previously made similar arguments.

=== Principle of sufficient reason ===
Since Leibniz philosophers have discussed the principle of sufficient reason, or PSR. Van Inwagen criticizes the PSR, while Alexander Pruss defends it.

=== Philosophy of time ===
Analytic philosophy of time traces its roots to British idealist John McTaggart's article "The Unreality of Time" (1908). McTaggart distinguishes between the dynamic or tensed A-theory of time (past, present, future), in which time flows; and the static or tenseless B-theory of time (earlier than, simultaneous with, later than). Arthur Prior, who invented tense logic, advocated the A-theory of time. Along with David Lewis's perdurantism, the theory of special relativity seems to advocate a B-theory of time.

Eternalism holds that past, present, and future are equally real. In contrast, presentism holds that only entities in the present exist. The moving spotlight theory is a kind of hybrid view where all moments exist, but only one moment is present. Growing block, advocated by Charlie Broad, holds that only the past and present exist, but the future does not (yet) exist (there is also the reverse, a shrinking block).

=== Logical pluralism ===
Many-valued and non-classical logics have been popular since the Polish logician Jan Łukasiewicz. Graham Priest is a dialetheist, denying the law of non-contradiction, seeing it as the most natural solution to problems such as the liar paradox. JC Beall, together with Greg Restall, is a pioneer of a widely discussed version of logical pluralism, the view that there is more than one correct logic.

== Epistemology ==
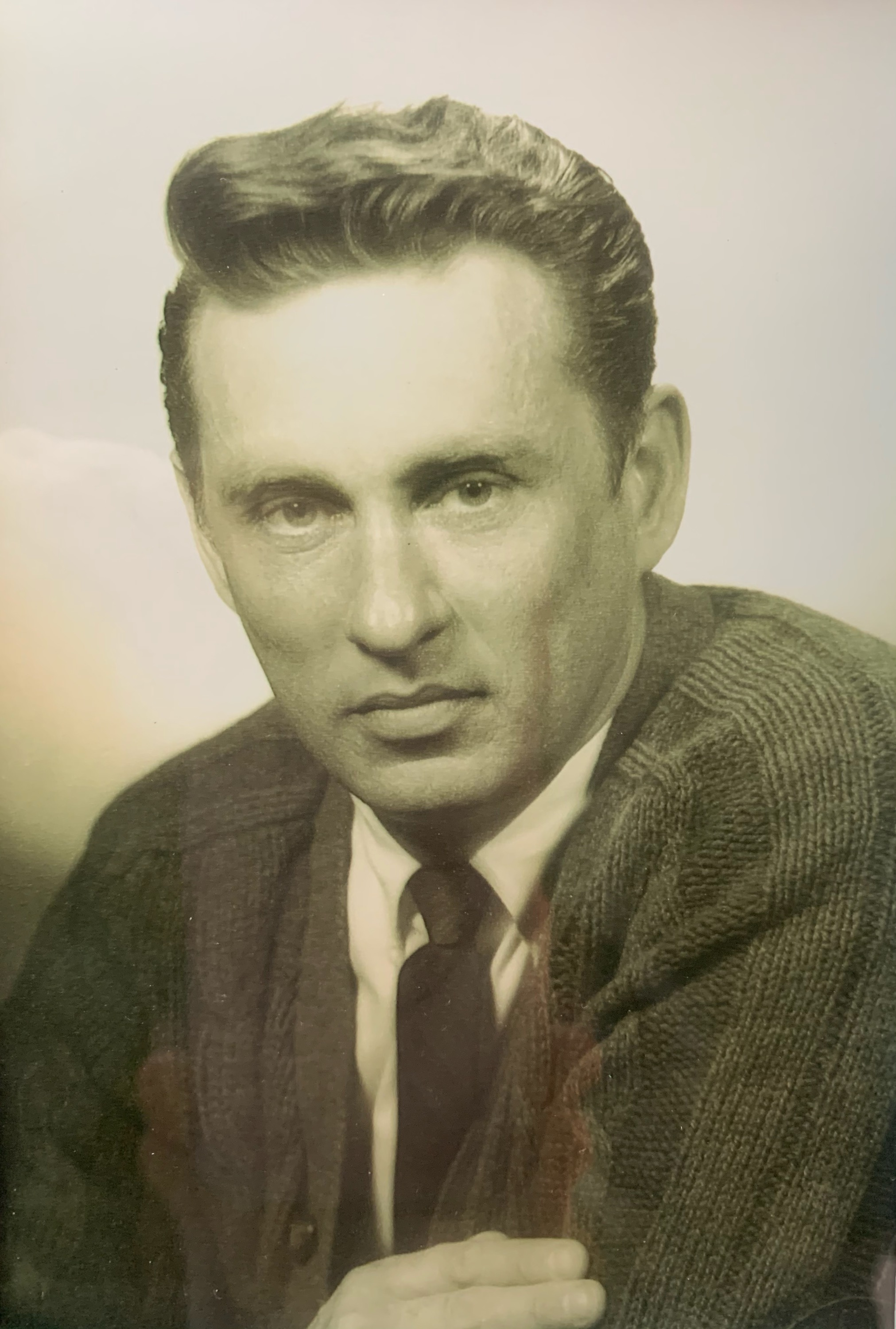
Edmund Gettier helped to revitalize analytic epistemology.

Owing largely to Edmund Gettier's paper "Is Justified True Belief Knowledge?" (1963) and the so-called Gettier problem, epistemology has since enjoyed a resurgence as a topic of analytic philosophy. Using epistemic luck, Gettier provided counterexamples to the "justified true belief" (JTB) definition of knowledge, found as early as Plato's dialogue Theaetetus. Philosophers give alternatives to the JTB account or develop theories of justification to deal with Gettier's examples. For example, Timothy Williamson argues in Knowledge and Its Limits (2000) that knowledge is sui generis and indefinable.

=== Theories of justification ===
American philosopher Roderick Chisholm defended foundationalism. Michael Huemer defends a type of foundationalism called phenomenal conservatism. Quine defended coherentism, a "web of belief", and thought all beliefs are open to revision; some are just held stronger than others, and so hold come what may. Ernest Sosa proposed virtue epistemology in "The Raft and the Pyramid" (1980). Alvin Goldman developed a causal theory of knowledge.

The debate between internalism and externalism still exists in analytic philosophy. Huemer is an internalist. Goldman is an externalist known for developing a popular form of externalism called reliabilism. Most externalists reject the KK thesis, which has been disputed since the introduction of epistemic logic by Jaakko Hintikka in 1962. Fallibilists also often reject the KK thesis.

=== Problem of the criterion ===
Discussed since antiquity, Chisholm, in his Theory of Knowledge (1966), details the problem of the criterion with two sets of questions:

1. What do we know? or What is the extent of our knowledge?
2. How do we know? or What is the criterion for deciding whether we have knowledge in any particular case?

Answering the former question first is called particularism, whereas answering the latter first is called methodism. A third solution is skepticism, or doubting there is such a thing as knowledge.

=== Closure ===
Epistemic closure is the claim that knowledge is closed under entailment; in other words, epistemic closure is a property or the principle that if a subject $S$ knows $p$, and $S$ knows that $p$ entails $q$, then $S$ can thereby come to know $q$. Most epistemological theories involve a closure principle, as do many skeptical arguments (e. g. the dream argument). In Proof of An External World (1939), G. E. Moore uses closure in his famous anti-skeptical "here is one hand" argument. Shortly before his death, Wittgenstein wrote the posthumously published On Certainty (1969) in response to Moore.

While the closure principle is generally regarded as intuitive, philosophers, such as Fred Dretske with relevant alternatives theory and Robert Nozick's truth tracking theory of knowledge in Philosophical Explanations (1981), have argued against it. Others argue it is true but only given a specific context.

=== Induction ===
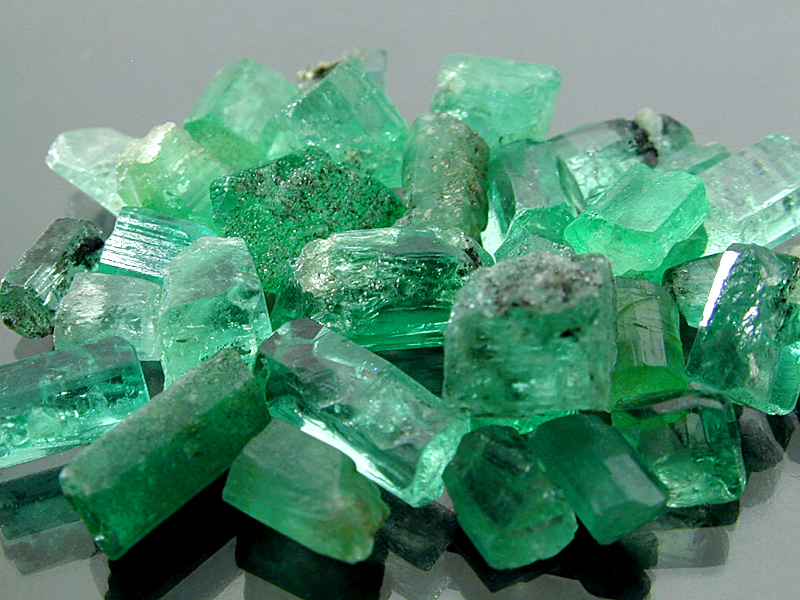
All emeralds are "grue".

In his book Fact, Fiction, and Forecast (1955), Nelson Goodman introduced the "new riddle of induction", so-called by analogy with Hume's classical problem of induction. Goodman's famous example was to introduce the predicates grue and bleen. "Grue" applies to all things before a certain arbitrary time t, just in case they are green, but also just in case they are blue after time t; and "bleen" applies to all things before time t, just in the case they are blue, but also just in case they are green after time t. So the inductive inference "All emeralds are grue" will be true before time t but "All emeralds are bleen" will be true after t.

=== Other topics ===
Other, related topics of research include debates over cases of knowledge, the value of knowledge, the nature of evidence, the role of intuitions in justification, and abduction.

== Ethics ==
Early analytic philosophers often thought ethics could not be made rigorous enough to merit any attention. It was only with the emergence of ordinary-language philosophers that ethics started to become acceptable. Analytic philosophers have gradually come to distinguish three major types of moral philosophy.

- Meta-ethics, which investigates moral terms and concepts;
- Normative ethics, which examines and produces ethical judgments;
- Applied ethics, which applies normative principles to specific, practical issues.

=== Meta-ethics ===
As well as Hume's famous is–ought problem, twentieth-century meta-ethics has two original strains.

==== Principia Ethica ====
The first strain is based on G. E. Moore's Principia Ethica (1903), which advances non-naturalist moral realism. The work is known for the open question argument and identifying the naturalistic fallacy, major topics for analytic philosophers. According to Moore, goodness is sui generis, a simple (undefinable), non-natural property. Contemporary philosophers, such as Russ Shafer-Landau in Moral Realism: A Defence (2003), still defend ethical non-naturalism.

After Moore's work, not much was done in analytic philosophy with ethics until the 1950s and 1960s, when there was a renewed interest in traditional moral philosophy. Philippa Foot defended naturalist moral realism and contributed several essays attacking other theories. (Note: Foot was the granddaughter of former US President Grover Cleveland.) Foot introduced the famous "trolley problem" into the ethical discourse. A student and friend of Wittgenstein, Elizabeth Anscombe, wrote a monograph Intention (1957) with an influential treatment of action. Her article "Modern Moral Philosophy" (1958) criticized consequentialism.

==== Emotivism ====
The second strain is founded on logical positivism and its attitude that unverifiable statements are meaningless. As a result, they avoided normative ethics and instead pursued meta-ethics. The logical positivists thought statements about value—including all ethical and aesthetic judgments—are non-cognitive. As a result, they adopted an emotivist theory, also known as the hurrah/boo theory, according to which valuing judgments expressed the attitude of the speaker. On this view, saying, "Murder is wrong", is equivalent to saying, "Boo to murder", or saying the word "murder" with a particular tone of disapproval.

J. O. Urmson gave his own "grading theory" in "On Grading" (1950) and was admiring but critical of emotivism in The Emotive Theory of Ethics (1968). Emotivism evolved into more sophisticated non-cognitivist theories, such as the expressivism of Charles Stevenson in Ethics and Language (1944), and the universal prescriptivism of R. M. Hare, which was based on Austin's philosophy of speech acts. Other anti-realist moral theorists include Australian John Mackie, who in Ethics: Inventing Right And Wrong (1977) defended error theory and the argument from queerness. Bernard Williams also influenced ethics by advocating a kind of moral relativism and rejecting all other theories.

=== Normative ethics ===
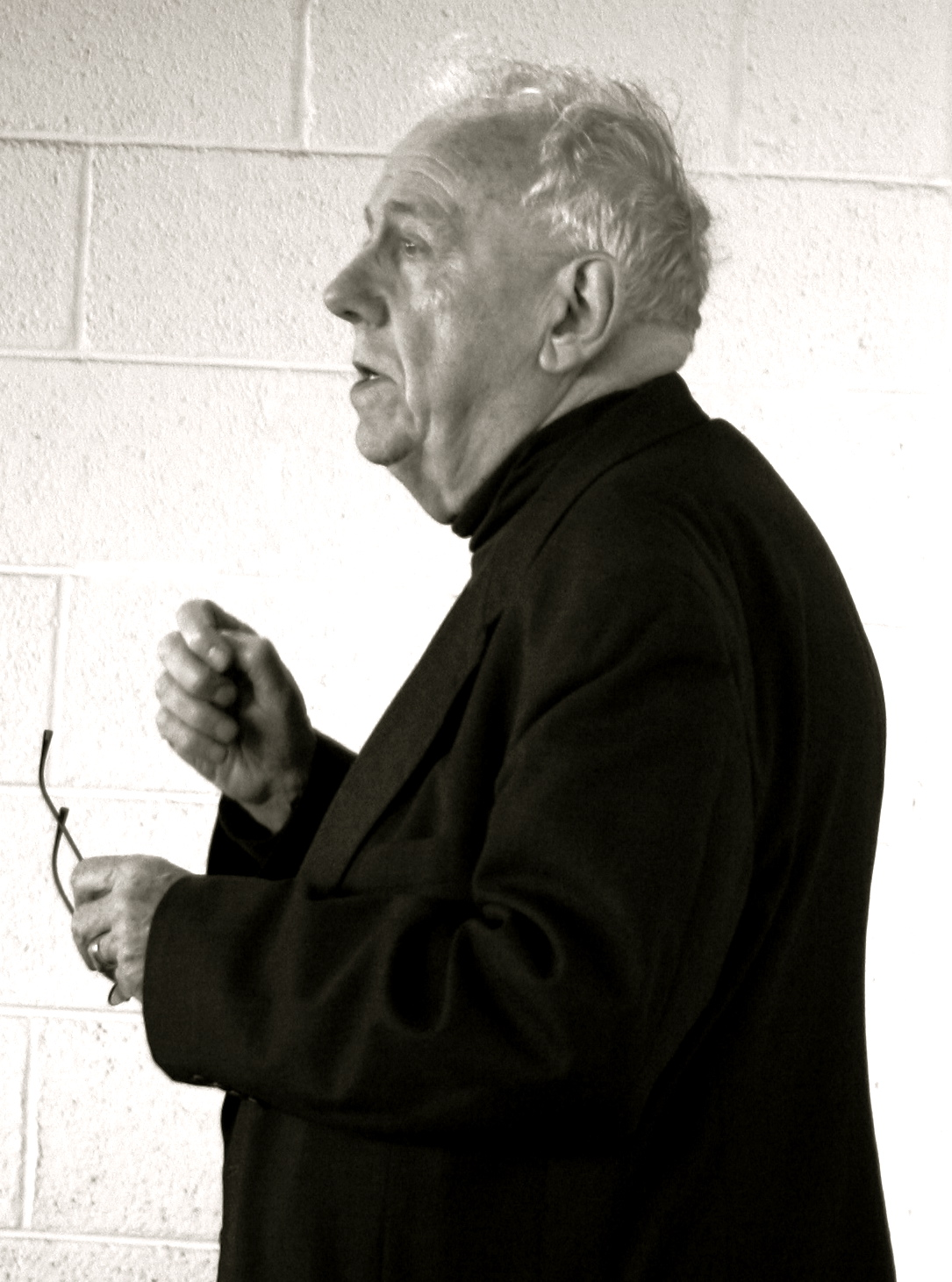
Alasdair MacIntyre

As the influence of logical positivism declined, analytic philosophers had a renewed interest in normative ethics. Contemporary normative ethics is dominated by three schools: consequentialism, deontology, and virtue ethics.

At first, consequentialism or utilitarianism was the only non-skeptical theory to remain popular among analytic philosophers. Henry Sidgwick's The Methods of Ethics (1874) exemplified the common theory. Robert Nozick criticizes utilitarianism with the utility monster. John Rawls's A Theory of Justice (1971) restored interest in Kantian, deontological ethical philosophy. Thomas Nagel also defended deontology.

Anscombe, Foot, and Alasdair Macintyre's After Virtue (1981) sparked a revival of Aristotle's virtue ethical approach. This increased interest in virtue ethics has been dubbed by some the "aretaic turn". Similar to Aristotle's notion of eudaimonia, Władysław Tatarkiewicz proposed a conception of happiness as a full and lasting satisfaction with one's whole life.

=== Applied ethics ===
Since around 1970, a significant feature of analytic philosophy has been the emergence of applied ethics. Difficult cases are often created by new technology or new scientific knowledge. Topics of special interest include education, such as equal opportunity and punishment in schools, environmental ethics, animal rights, and the many challenges created by advancing medical science, such as abortion or euthanasia. Peter Singer argues for vegetarianism in the book Animal Liberation (1975).

== Political philosophy ==
One of the most influential figures in the philosophy of law was ordinary language philosopher H. L. A. Hart, who was instrumental in the development of legal positivism, popularized by his book The Concept of Law (1961). (Note: However, key ideas in the book have also received sustained criticism.) Influenced by Hart and Ronald Dworkin, Matthew Kramer also proposed ethical (or normative) legal positivism.

=== Liberalism ===
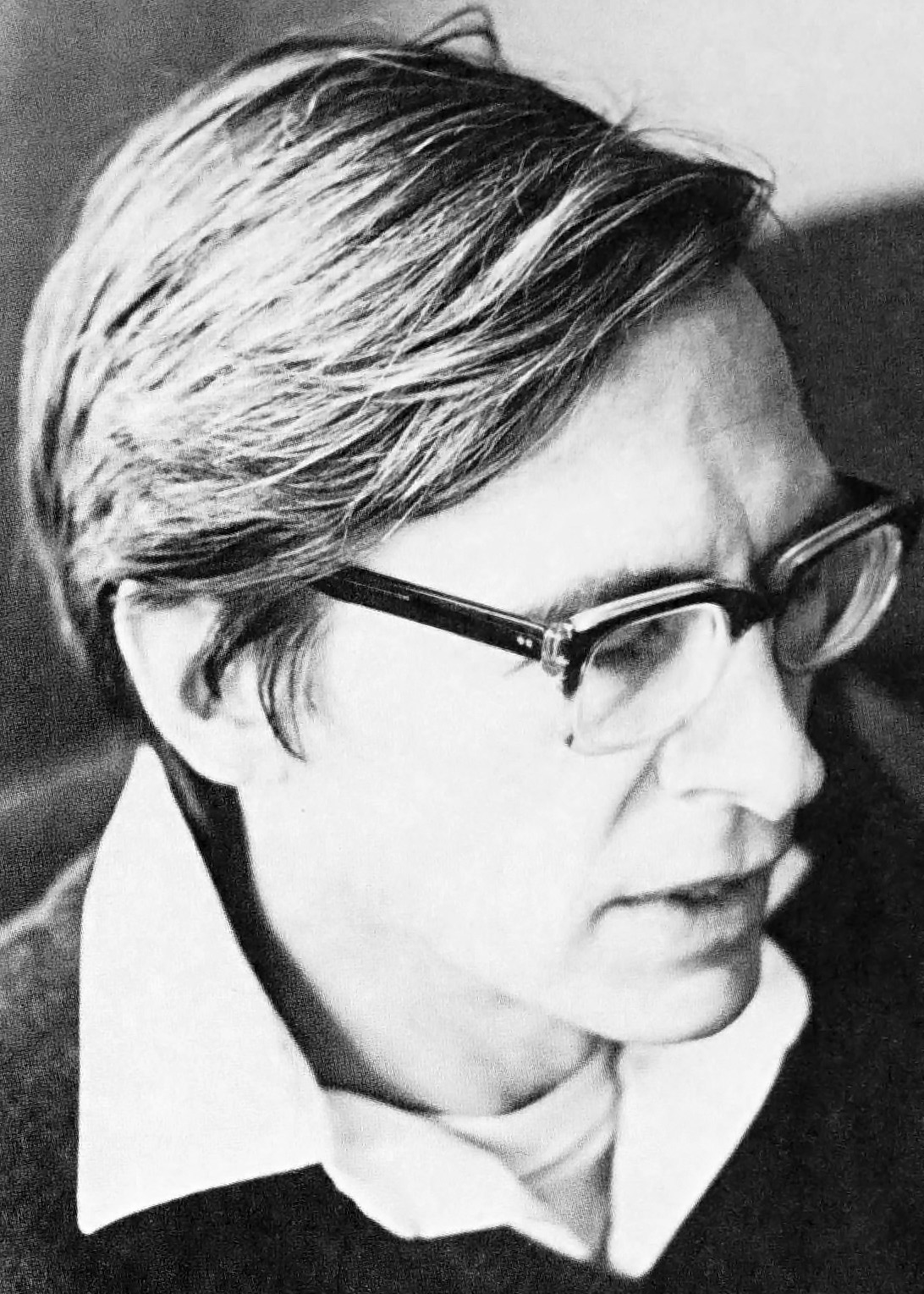
John Rawls

During World War II, Karl Popper defended the open society in The Open Society and its Enemies (1945). Isaiah Berlin had a lasting influence with his lecture "Two Concepts of Liberty" (1958). Berlin defined 'negative liberty' as absence of coercion or interference in private actions. 'Positive liberty' could be thought of as self-mastery, which asks not what we are free from, but what we are free to do.

Current analytic political philosophy owes much to John Rawls, who in a series of papers (most notably "Two Concepts of Rules" (1955) and "Justice as Fairness" (1958)) and his book A Theory of Justice (1971) produced a sophisticated defense of a generally liberal egalitarian account of distributive justice. Rawls introduced the thought experiment of the veil of ignorance.

=== Libertarianism ===
Rawls's colleague Robert Nozick's book Anarchy, State, and Utopia (1974) defends free-market libertarianism. It is notable for the Wilt Chamberlain argument. Nozick also famously considers an objection to the labor theory of property found in Locke's Second Treatise on Government (1689):

[W]hy isn't mixing what I own with what I don't own a way of losing what I own rather than a way of gaining what I don't? If I own a can of tomato juice and spill it in the sea so that its molecules (made radioactive, so I can check this) mingle evenly throughout the sea, do I thereby come to own the sea, or have I foolishly dissipated my tomato juice?

=== Analytical Marxism ===
Another development was the school of analytical Marxism, which applies analytic techniques to the theories of Karl Marx and his successors. The best-known member is G. A. Cohen, whose book Karl Marx's Theory of History: A Defence (1978) defends Marx's historical materialism, and is generally considered the genesis of the school. Cohen jettisons the labor theory of value, and describes the structure of proletarian unfreedom, emphasizing power and freedom rather than labor-power and value. Other prominent analytical Marxists include the economist John Roemer, the social scientist Jon Elster, and the sociologist Erik Olin Wright. These later philosophers furthered Cohen's work by bringing to bear modern social science methods, such as rational choice theory.

Although a continental philosopher, Frankfurt School theorist Jürgen Habermas is another influential—if controversial—author in contemporary analytic political philosophy. Habermas's social theory is a blend of social science, Marxism, post-Kantianism, and pragmatism.

=== Communitarianism ===
Communitarians such as Alasdair MacIntyre, Charles Taylor, Michael Walzer, and Michael Sandel use analytic techniques to challenge liberal assumptions. In particular, communitarians challenge whether the individual can be considered apart from the community in which he is brought up and lives. While in the analytic tradition, its major exponents often also engage at length with figures generally considered continental, notably Hegel and Friedrich Nietzsche.

=== Other critics of liberalism ===
Other critics of liberalism include the feminist critiques by Catharine MacKinnon and Andrea Dworkin, and the multiculturalist critiques by Amy Gutmann, Charles Taylor, and left-libertarians such as Hillel Steiner.

== Aesthetics ==
While pragmatist George Santayana wrote The Sense of Beauty (1896), and British idealist R. G. Collingwood developed a theory of aesthetic expressivism in The Principles of Art (1938), aesthetics was not addressed in the analytic style until the 1950s and 1960s, by the likes of Susanne Langer, Frank Sibley, Morris Weitz, and Nelson Goodman. Since Goodman and Languages of Art (1968), aesthetics as a discipline for analytic philosophers has flourished.

=== Definitions of art ===
Sibley, Weitz, and Goodman were anti-essentialists. In "The Role of Theory in Aesthetics" (1956), Weitz famously argues necessary and sufficient conditions will never exist for the concept 'art' because it is an "open concept". Goodman thought art is not so different from science, and is another branch of epistemology.

Arthur Danto argued for an "institutional definition of art" in the essay "The Artworld" (1964) in which Danto coined the term "artworld" (as opposed to the existing "art world", though they mean the same), by which he meant cultural context or "an atmosphere of art theory". George Dickie similarly states "a work of art in the classificatory sense is 1) an artifact 2) on which some person or persons acting on behalf of a certain social institution (the artworld) has conferred the status of candidate for appreciation." Dickie's student Noël Carroll is a leading philosopher of art contributing to the philosophy of film.

There is also the historical definition, best exemplified by Jerrold Levinson. For Levinson, "a work of art is a thing intended for regard-as-a-work-of-art: regard in any of the ways works of art existing prior to it have been correctly regarded." In the opinion of historian of aesthetics Władysław Tatarkiewicz, there are six conditions for the presentation of art: beauty, form, representation, reproduction of reality, artistic expression, and innovation. Nicholas Wolterstorff emphasizes the social aspect of art, not as mere contemplation but as action. Langer, Levinson and Wolterstorff have all contributed to the philosophy of music.

=== Beauty ===
Guy Sircello's work resulted in new analytic theories of love, sublimity, and beauty. For Sircello, beauty is an objective, qualitative property. One author claims Sircello's theory is similar to Hume's. Mary Mothersill sought to restore earlier conceptions of beauty in Beauty Restored (1984). Roger Scruton also advanced theories of beauty. According to Kant scholar Paul Guyer, "After Wollheim, the most significant British aesthetician has been Roger Scruton." Scruton contributed to the philosophy of architecture.

=== Paradox of fiction ===
Colin Radford and Michael Weston introduced the paradox of fiction in their paper "How Can We Be Moved by the Fate of Anna Karenina?" (1975) The paper discusses emotional responses to fiction, such as Leo Tolstoy's novel Anna Karenina. Their question is how people can be moved by things that do not exist. The paper concluded people's emotional responses to fiction are irrational. American philosopher Kendall Walton's paper "Fearing Fictions" (1978) addresses the paradox. This paper served as the impetus for make-believe theory.

== Philosophy of language ==
Philosophy of language is still strongly influenced by earlier authors.

=== Semantics ===
John Searle advocated Russell's descriptivism and tried to elaborate it with a "cluster theory" of descriptions. Kripke challenged the descriptivist theory with a causal theory of reference in Naming and Necessity. According to one author, "In the philosophy of language, Naming and Necessity is among the most important works ever." Ruth Barcan Marcus also challenged descriptivism with a direct reference theory, in her case a tag theory of names. Keith Donnellan too challenged descriptivism.

Hilary Putnam used the Twin Earth and brain in a vat thought experiments to argue for semantic externalism, or the view that the meanings of words are not psychological. Donald Davidson uses the thought experiment of Swampman to advocate for semantic externalism. Tyler Burge uses the thought experiment of arthritis in one's thigh.

Kripke in Wittgenstein on Rules and Private Language (1982) provides a skeptical, rule-following paradox, undermining the possibility of our ever following rules, and so calls into question the idea of meaning. Kripke writes this paradox is "the most radical and original skeptical problem that philosophy has seen to date". The portmanteau "Kripkenstein" has been coined as a term for a fictional person who holds the views expressed by Kripke's reading of Wittgenstein.

Alonzo Church pioneered intensional logic. Czech philosopher Pavel Tichý developed transparent intensional logic.

=== Pragmatics ===
Paul Grice and his maxims and theory of implicature established the discipline of pragmatics. Austin and John Searle also influenced the field. Pragmatics focuses on deixis and presuppositions and other context-dependent features of language.

== Philosophy of mind ==
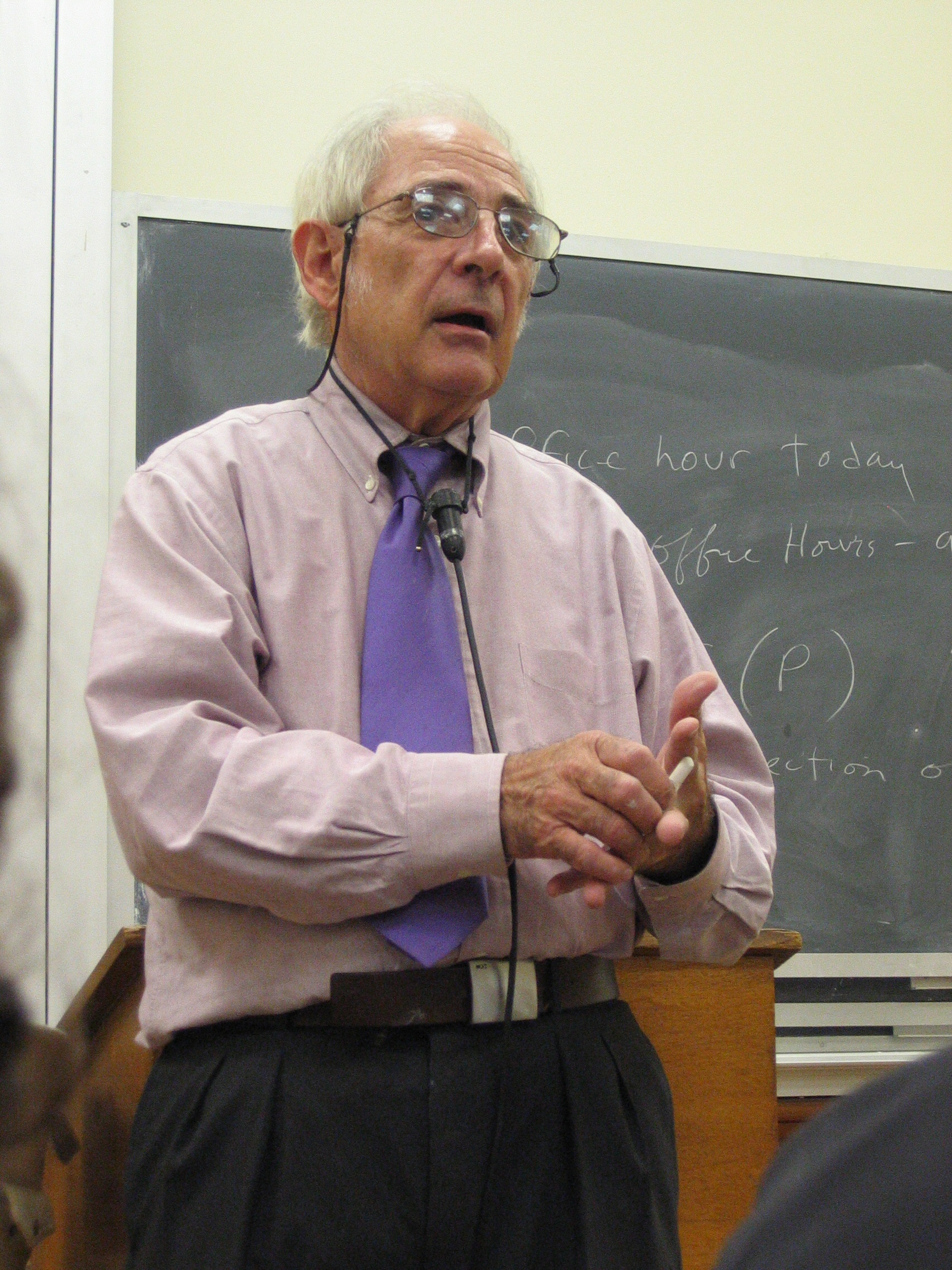
John Searle

Analytic philosophy's interest in philosophy of language has arguably been superseded by an interest in the philosophy of mind. Two common notions in analytic philosophy of mind are intentionality, as above, and qualia, a term introduced by C. I. Lewis.

=== Physicalism ===
Emergent materialism holds that mental properties emerge as novel properties of complex material systems. It can be divided into emergence which denies mental causation and emergence which allows for causal effect. A version of the latter type was advocated by John Searle, called biological naturalism. (Note: Searle famously debated continental philosopher Derrida.) Douglas Hofstadter also believes the mind is emergent in Gödel, Escher, Bach: An Eternal Golden Braid, from self-referential "strange loops".

The other main group of materialist views in the philosophy of mind can be labeled non-emergent (or non-emergentist) materialism, and includes philosophical behaviorism, type identity theory (reductive materialism), functionalism, and pure physicalism (eliminative materialism).

==== Behaviorism ====
Motivated by the logical positivists, behaviorism was the most prominent theory of mind in analytic philosophy for the first half of the twentieth century. Behaviorists believed either that statements about the mind were equivalent to statements about behavior and dispositions to behave in particular ways; or that mental states were directly equivalent to behavior and dispositions to behave. Hilary Putnam criticized behaviorism by arguing that it confuses the symptoms of mental states with the mental states themselves, positing "super Spartans" who never display signs of pain.

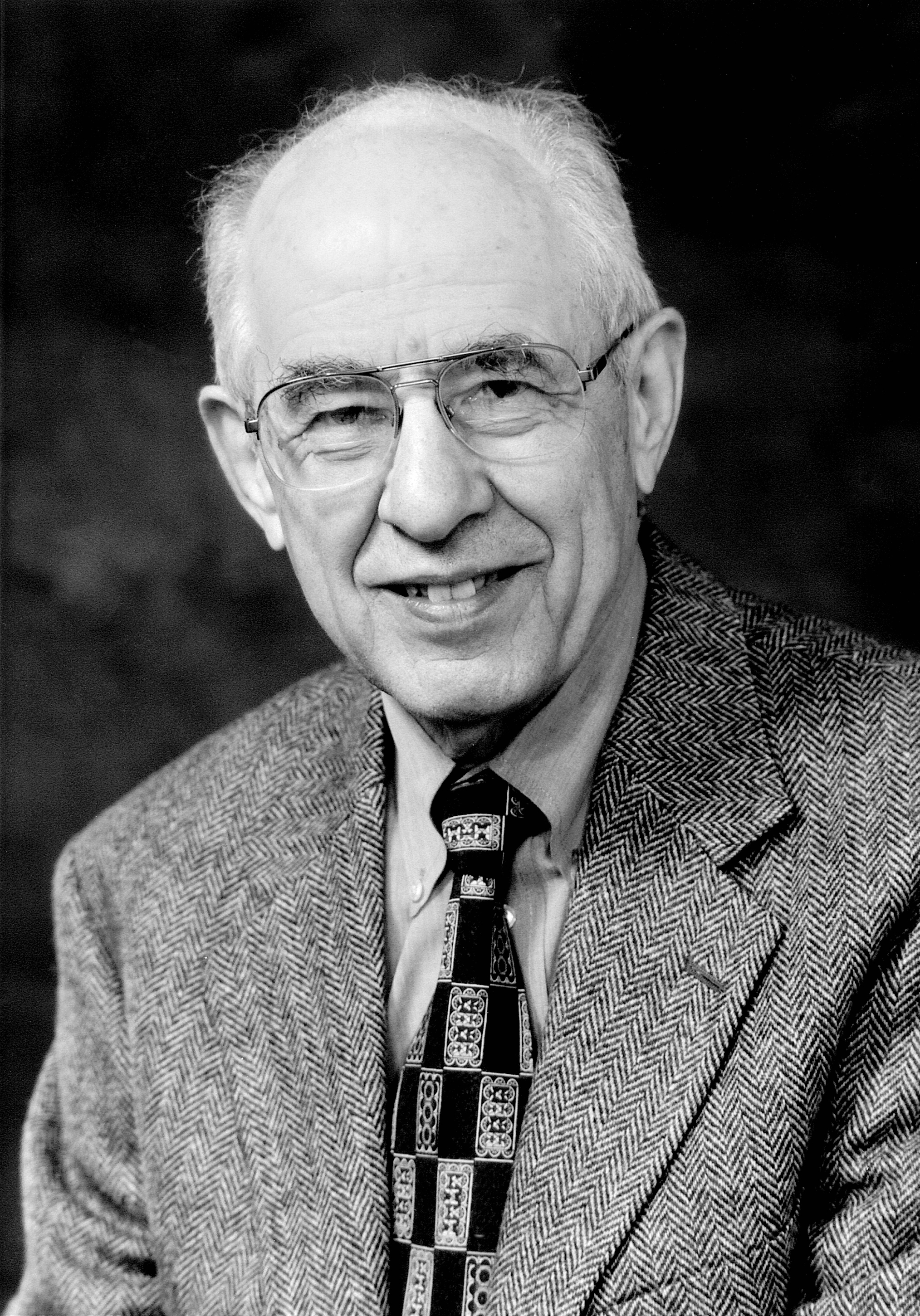
Hilary Putnam

==== Type identity ====
Behaviorism later became much less popular in favor of either type identity theory or functionalism. Type identity theory or type physicalism identified mental states with brain states. Former students of Ryle at the University of Adelaide Jack Smart and Ullin Place argued for type physicalism. Type identity was criticized by Putnam and others using multiple realizability. The criticism spawned anomalous monism.

==== Functionalism ====
Functionalism remains the dominant theory. (Note: In a 2020 PhilPapers survey, 33% of respondents were accepting or leaning towards it.) Computationalism is a kind of functionalism. The view was first associated with Sellars. Putnam was also a functionalist. Another functionalist was Jerry Fodor, who is known for proposing the modularity of mind, a theory of innateness. He also introduced the language of thought hypothesis, which describes thought as possessing syntax or compositional structure (sometimes known as mentalese). Searle's Chinese room argument criticized functionalism and holds that while a computer can understand syntax, it could never understand semantics. A similar idea is Ned Block's China brain.

==== Eliminativism ====
The view of eliminative materialism is most closely associated with Paul and Patricia Churchland, who deny the existence of propositional attitudes; and with Daniel Dennett, who in works like Consciousness Explained (1991) is generally considered an eliminativist about qualia and phenomenal aspects of consciousness (but not about intentionality). Dennett coined the term "intuition pump." Thomas Nagel's paper "What Is It Like to Be a Bat?" challenged the physicalist account of mind; so did Frank Jackson's knowledge argument, which argues for qualia.

=== Dualism ===
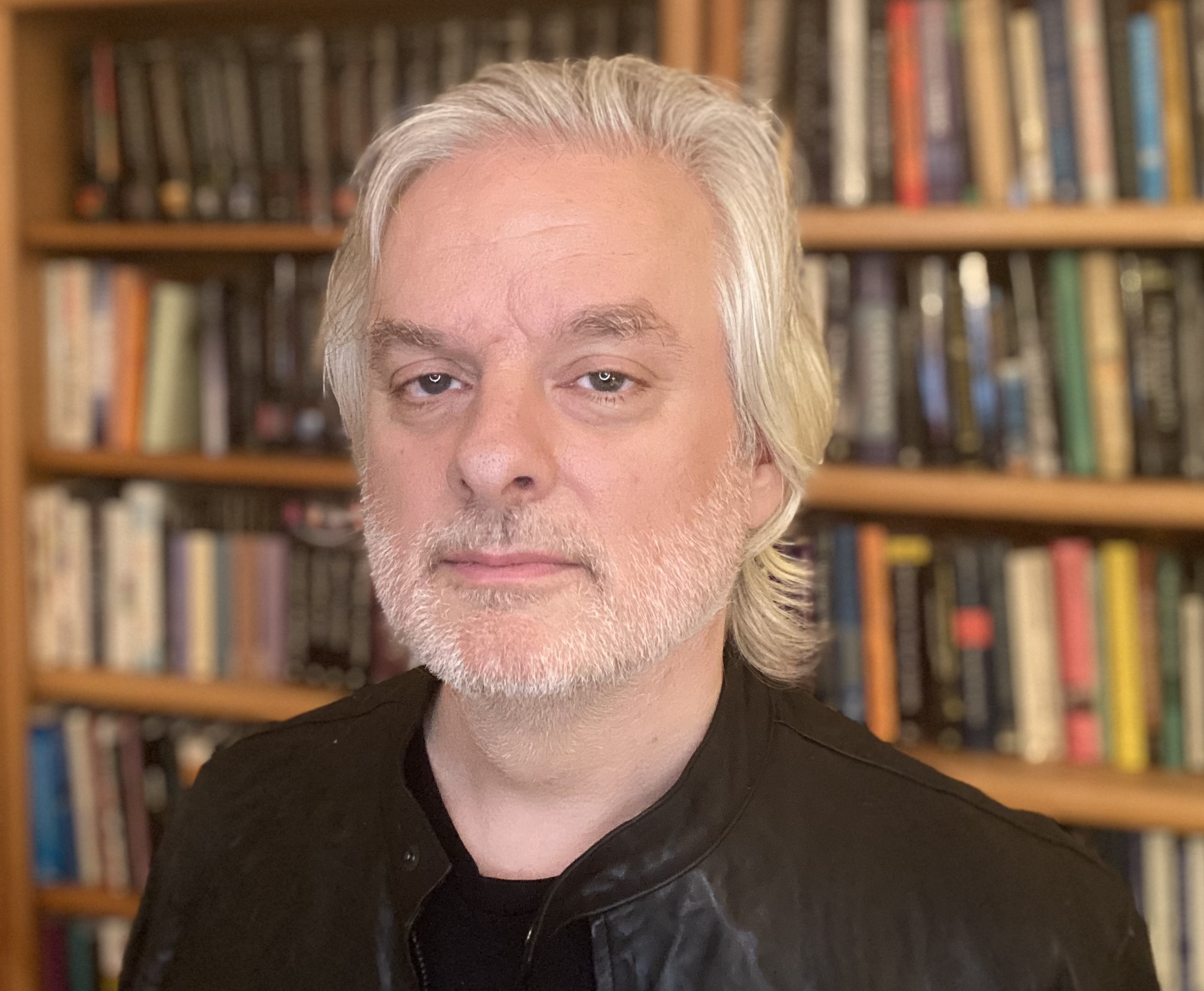
David Chalmers

Finally, analytic philosophy has featured a certain number of philosophers who were dualists, and recently forms of property dualism have had a resurgence; the most prominent representative is David Chalmers. Chalmers introduced the notion of the hard problem of consciousness. He has criticized interactionism and shown sympathy with neutral monism. Kripke also makes a notable argument for dualism. Epiphenomenalism, the view that mental events are caused by physical events in the brain but do not cause anything else in return, is sometimes classed as a kind of property dualism.

=== Panpsychism ===
Yet another view is panpsychism, or the view that mentality is fundamental and ubiquitous in the natural world. Panpsychism can be contrasted with idealism by still believing in matter. (Note: While analytic idealism remains a minority position, one notable example is the work of Bernardo Kastrup. It seeks to resolve the so-called hard problem of consciousness by taking experience as ontologically fundamental.)

=== Perception and consciousness ===
In recent years, a central focus of research in the philosophy of mind has been consciousness and the philosophy of perception. The homunculus argument is an objection raised against many older theories of perception. While there is now a general consensus for the global neuronal workspace model of consciousness, there are many opinions as to the specifics. The best known theories in analytic philosophy are Searle's naive realism, Fred Dretske and Michael Tye's representationalism, Dennett's heterophenomenology, and the higher-order theories of either David M. Rosenthal—who advocates a higher-order thought (HOT) model—or David Armstrong and William Lycan—who advocate a higher-order perception (HOP) model. (Note: An alternative higher-order theory, the higher-order global states (HOGS) model, is offered by Robert van Gulick.)

== Philosophy of mathematics ==
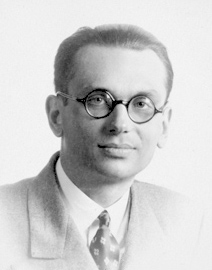
Kurt Gödel

Kurt Gödel, a student of Hans Hahn of the Vienna Circle, produced his incompleteness theorems showing that Principia Mathematica also failed to reduce arithmetic to logic, and that Hilbert's program was unattainable. Ernst Zermelo and Abraham Fraenkel established Zermelo Fraenkel Set Theory (with the axiom of choice, abbreviated as ZFC). Quine developed his own system, dubbed New Foundations.

Physicist Eugene Wigner's seminal paper "The Unreasonable Effectiveness of Mathematics in the Natural Sciences" (1960) poses the question of why a formal pursuit like mathematics can have real utility.

Hilbert's Hotel shows some of the counterintuitive properties of infinite sets. José Benardete in Infinity: An Essay in Metaphysics (1964) argued for the reality of infinity. The Grim Reaper paradox stems from his work. Finitists reject infinity.

Akin to the medieval debate on universals, between realists, idealists, and nominalists; the philosophy of mathematics has the debate between logicists or platonists, conceptualists or intuitionists, and formalists.

=== Platonism ===
Gödel was a platonist who postulated a special kind of intuition that lets one perceive mathematical objects directly. Quine and Putnam argued for platonism with the indispensability argument. Edward Zalta devised abstract object theory. Crispin Wright, along with Bob Hale, led a Neo-Fregean revival with the work Frege's Conception of Numbers as Objects (1983). Physicist Roger Penrose is also a mathematical platonist, in works like The Road to Reality (2004).

Structuralist Paul Benacerraf has two well-known objections to mathematical platonism; one is about identification, and the other epistemological. In the latter, Benacerraf argues that while platonism explains mathematical semantics, it does not simultaneously explain mathematical knowledge. It is hard to know anything about a far-removed, platonic object. Predicativism is another alternative to platonism, utilizing Henri Poincaré's response to Russell's paradox. There are also Aristotelians in mathematics, such as Dale Jacquette.

=== Intuitionism ===
The intuitionists, led by Dutch mathematician L. E. J. Brouwer, are a constructivist school which sees mathematics as a cognitive construct rather than a type of objective truth. Brouwer also influenced Wittgenstein's abandonment of the Tractatus.

=== Formalism ===
The formalists, best exemplified by David Hilbert, considered mathematics to be merely the investigation of formal axiom systems. Hartry Field defended mathematical fictionalism in Science Without Numbers (1980), arguing numbers are dispensable.

== Philosophy of religion ==
In Analytic Philosophy of Religion, James Franklin Harris noted that:

...analytic philosophy has been a very heterogeneous 'movement'.... some forms of analytic philosophy have proven very sympathetic to the philosophy of religion and have provided a philosophical mechanism for responding to other more radical and hostile forms of analytic philosophy.

Analytic philosophy tended to avoid the study of religion, largely dismissing (as per the logical positivists) the subject as a part of metaphysics and therefore meaningless. (Note: A notable exception is the series of Michael B. Foster's 1934–36 Mind articles involving the Christian doctrine of creation and the rise of modern science.) The demise of logical positivism led to a renewed interest in the philosophy of religion, prompting philosophers not only to introduce new problems, but to re-study perennial topics such as the existence of God, the rationality of belief, the nature of miracles, the problem of evil, and several others. The Society of Christian Philosophers was established in 1978.

=== Reformed epistemology ===
Analytic philosophy formed the basis for some sophisticated Christian arguments, such as those of the reformed epistemologists including Alvin Plantinga, William Alston, and Nicholas Wolterstorff.

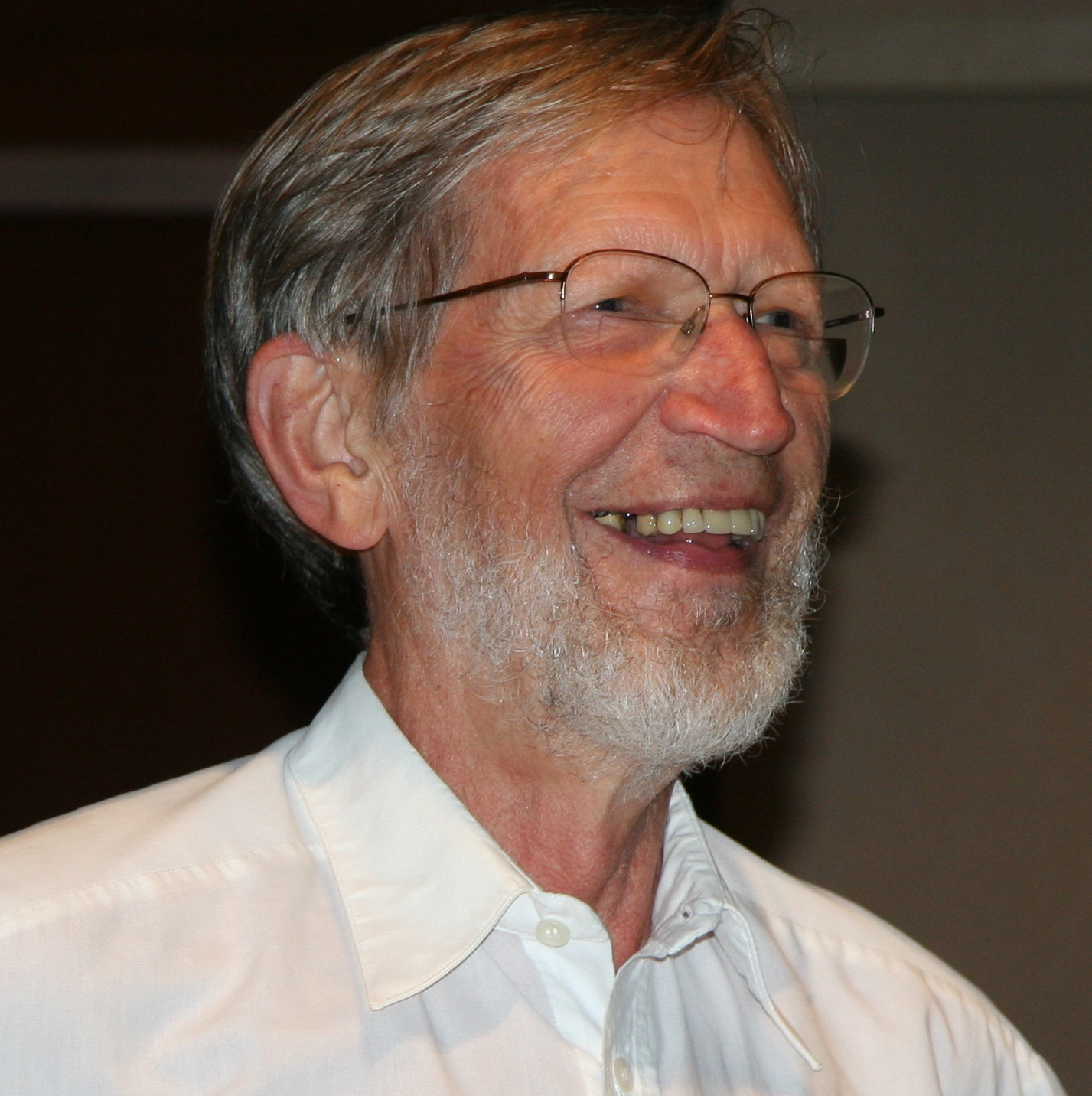
Alvin Plantinga

Plantinga was once described by Time magazine as "America's leading orthodox Protestant philosopher of God". His seminal work God and Other Minds (1967) argues belief in God is a properly basic belief akin to the belief in other minds. Plantinga also developed a modal ontological argument in The Nature of Necessity (1974). Plantinga, John Mackie, and Antony Flew debated the use of the free will defense as a way to solve the problem of evil. Plantinga further issued a trilogy on epistemology, Warrant: The Current Debate (1993), Warrant and Proper Function (1993), and Warranted Christian Belief (2000). Plantinga's evolutionary argument against naturalism contends there is a problem in asserting both evolution and naturalism.

Alston defended divine command theory. Robert Merrihew Adams also defended divine command theory, and the virtue of faith. William Lane Craig defends the Kalam cosmological argument in the book of the same name.

=== Analytic Thomism ===
Catholic analytic philosophers—such as Elizabeth Anscombe, her husband Peter Geach, MacIntyre, Anthony Kenny, John Haldane, Eleonore Stump, and others—developed Analytic Thomism.

=== Eastern Orthodoxy ===
Eastern Orthodox convert Richard Swinburne wrote a trilogy of books arguing for God, The Coherence of Theism (1977), The Existence of God (1979), and Faith and Reason (1981). Swinburne is notable for his belief that God's existence is contingent rather than necessary (it is possible God does not exist), but that nonetheless He does exist as a brute fact.

=== Wittgenstein and religion ===
The analytic philosophy of religion has been preoccupied with Wittgenstein, as well as his interpretation of Søren Kierkegaard. Wittgenstein fought for the Austrian army in World War I and came upon a copy of Leo Tolstoy's The Gospel in Brief (1896). He subsequently underwent some kind of religious conversion. "Swansea school" philosophers such as Rush Rhees, Peter Winch, and D. Z. Phillips, among others, founded a school of religious thought based on Wittgenstein. The name "contemplative philosophy" was coined by Phillips in Philosophy's Cool Place (1999), (Note: This interpretation was first labeled "Wittgensteinian Fideism" by Kai Nielsen, but those who consider themselves members of the Swansea school rejected this construal as a caricature of Wittgenstein's position; this is especially true of Phillips. Nielsen and Phillips subsequently became two of the most prominent interpreters of Wittgenstein's philosophy of religion.) after a passage quoted in Wittgenstein's Culture and Value (1980). (Note: "My ideal is a certain coolness. A temple providing a setting for the passions without meddling with them.")

== Philosophy of science ==
The weight given to scientific evidence is largely due to philosophers' commitments to scientific realism and naturalism. Some such as Friedrich Hayek in The Counter-Revolution of Science (1952) see using science in philosophy as scientism. Nonetheless, science has had an increasingly significant role in analytic philosophy. The theory of special relativity has had a profound effect on the philosophy of time, and quantum physics is routinely discussed in the free will debate. Ernest Nagel's book The Structure of Science (1961) practically inaugurated the field of philosophy of science.

=== Theories ===
Carl Hempel advocated confirmation theory or Bayesian epistemology. He introduced the famous raven's paradox.

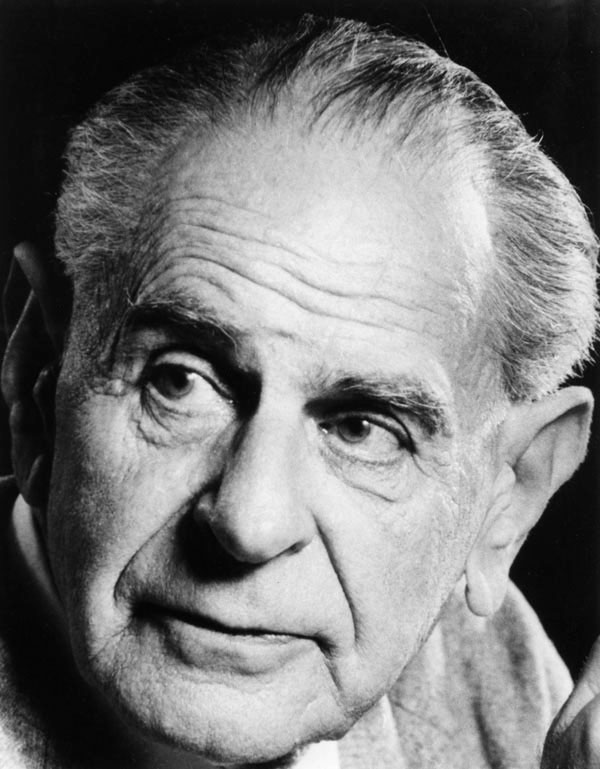
Karl Popper

In reaction to what he considered excesses of logical positivism, Karl Popper, in The Logic of Scientific Discovery (1959), rejects the standard inductivist views on the scientific method in favor of a highly influential theory of falsification, using it to solve the demarcation problem.

Quine and French scientist Pierre Duhem seemed to have similar views in certain respects. The Duhem–Quine thesis, or problem of underdetermination, posits that no scientific hypothesis can be understood in isolation, a viewpoint called confirmation holism. Following Quine and Duhem, subsequent theories emphasized theory-ladenness.

In reaction to both the logical positivists and Popper, philosophy became dominated by social constructivist and cognitive relativist theories of science. Significant for these discussions is Thomas Kuhn, who in The Structure of Scientific Revolutions (1962) formulated the idea of paradigm shifts and sparked a "revolt against positivism" known as the "historical turn". Paul Feyerabend's book Against Method (1975) advocates epistemological anarchism; that there are no universal rules for scientific inquiry.

=== Branches ===
Philosophers like Tim Maudlin focus on the philosophy of physics. Maudlin argues in The Metaphysics Within Physics (2007) that philosophy must reflect on physics, and that scientific laws are sui generis. Recently there has also been work in the philosophy of chemistry, and the philosophy of biology has undergone considerable growth, especially due to the debate over the nature of evolution, particularly natural selection. Daniel Dennett and his book Darwin's Dangerous Idea (1995), which defends Neo-Darwinism, stand at the forefront of this debate. Jerry Fodor criticizes natural selection in What Darwin Got Wrong (2010).

The philosophy of social science has also received increased interest. Peter Winch takes a Wittgensteinian perspective in The Idea of a Social Science and its Relation to Philosophy (1958). Searle contributed to social ontology and the theory of social constructs with The Construction of Social Reality (1995).

== See also ==
- History of logic
- Paradox of analysis

== Works cited ==
=== Articles ===
==== Primary ====
- Alston, William (1990). "Some suggestions for divine command theorists". In Beaty, Michael D. (ed.). Christian Theism and the Problems of Philosophy. University of Notre Dame Press. pp. 303–326.
- Anscombe, G. E. M. (1958). "Modern Moral Philosophy". Philosophy. 33 (124): 1–19. doi:10.1017/s0031819100037943. JSTOR 3749051. S2CID 197875941.
- Ayer, A. J., ed. (1959). "Editor's introduction". Logical Positivism. Free Press. pp. 3–30.
- Benacerraf, Paul (1973). "Mathematical truth". Journal of Philosophy. 70 (19): 661–679. doi:10.2307/2025075. JSTOR 2025075.
- Benacerraf, Paul (1965). "What Numbers Could Not Be". Philosophical Review. 74 (1): 47–73. doi:10.2307/2183530. JSTOR 2183530.
- Block, Ned (1978). "Troubles with functionalism". Minnesota Studies in the Philosophy of Science. 9: 261–325.
- Brady, Michael; Pritchard, Duncan (2005). "Epistemological Contextualism: Problems and Prospects". The Philosophical Quarterly. 55 (219): 161–171. doi:10.1111/j.0031-8094.2005.00393.x.
- Burge, Tyler (1979). "Individualism and the mental". Midwest Studies in Philosophy. 4: 73–122. doi:10.1111/j.1475-4975.1979.tb00374.x.
- Carnap, Rudolf (1959). "The Elimination of Metaphysics Through Logical Analysis of Language.". In Ayer, A. J. (ed.). Logical positivism. The Free Press. pp. 60–81.
- Carnap, Rudolf (1950). "Empiricism, Semantics, and Ontology". Revue Internationale de Philosophie. 4 (11): 20–40. JSTOR 23932367.
- Carroll, Lewis (1895). "What the Tortoise Said to Achilles". Mind. IV (14): 278–280. doi:10.1093/mind/IV.14.278.
- Chisholm, Roderick (1980). "A Version of Foundationalism". Midwest Studies in Philosophy. 5: 543–564. doi:10.1111/j.1475-4975.1980.tb00423.x.
- Churchland, Paul M. (February 1981). "Eliminative Materialism and the Propositional Attitudes" (PDF). The Journal of Philosophy. 78: 67–90.
- Cohen, Gerald Allan (1979). "The Labor Theory of Value and the Concept of Exploitation". Philosophy & Public Affairs. 8 (4): 338–360. Archived from the original on 19 April 2023. Included in History, Labour, and Freedom (1988), pp. 209–238.
- Cohen, Gerald Allan (Winter 1983). "The Structure of Proletarian Unfreedom" (PDF). Philosophy & Public Affairs. 12 (1): 3–33. Archived (PDF) from the original on 14 June 2025. Included in History, Labour, and Freedom (1988) pp. 255–285
- Danto, Arthur (October 1964). "The Artworld". Journal of Philosophy. 61 (19): 571–584. doi:10.2307/2022937. JSTOR 2022937.
- Davidson, Donald (1987). "Knowing One's Own Mind". Proceedings and Addresses of the American Philosophical Association. 60 (3): 441–458. doi:10.2307/3131782. ISSN 0065-972X. JSTOR 3131782.
- Davidson, Donald (1970). "Mental Events". Actions and Events. Clarendon.
- Dennett, Daniel (2001). "Are we explaining consciousness yet?". Cognition. 79 (1–2): 221–237. doi:10.1016/S0010-0277(00)00130-X. PMID 11164029. S2CID 2235514.
- Dennett, Daniel (1996). "Facing backwards on the problem of consciousness". Journal of Consciousness Studies. 3 (1): 4–6.
- Dennett, Daniel (1988). Marcel, Anthony J.; Bisiach, Edoardo (eds.). "Quining qualia". Consciousness in Contemporary Science. OUP.
- Donnellan, Keith S. (1966). "Reference and definite descriptions". Philosophical Review. 75 (3): 281–304. doi:10.2307/2183143. JSTOR 2183143.
- Dretske, Fred (1970). "Epistemic Operators". The Journal of Philosophy. 67 (24): 1007–1023. doi:10.2307/2024710. JSTOR 2024710.
- Feldman, Richard (1981). "Fallibilism and Knowing That One Knows". The Philosophical Review. 90 (2): 266–282. doi:10.2307/2184442. JSTOR 2184442.
- Foot, Philippa (1967). "The Problem of Abortion and the Doctrine of the Double Effect". Oxford Review. 5: 5–15.
- Frege, Gottlob (1951) [1892]. "On concept and object". Mind. 60 (238): 168–180. doi:10.1093/mind/LX.238.168.
- Frege, Gottlob (1948) [1892]. "Sense and Reference". The Philosophical Review. 57 (3): 209–230. doi:10.2307/2181485. ISSN 0031-8108. JSTOR 2181485.
- Frege, Gottlob (1956) [1918]. "The Thought: A Logical Inquiry". Mind. 65: 289–311. doi:10.1093/mind/65.1.289.
- Gettier, Edmund L. (1963). "Is Justified True Belief Knowledge?". Analysis. 23 (6): 121–123. doi:10.1093/analys/23.6.121.
- Gödel, Kurt (1931). On Formally Undecidable Propositions of Principia Mathematica and Related Systems. Basic Books.
- Goldman, Alvin I. (1967). "A Causal Theory of Knowing". The Journal of Philosophy. 64 (12): 357–372. doi:10.2307/2024268. ISSN 0022-362X. JSTOR 2024268.
- Grice, H. Paul (1975). Davidson, Donald (ed.). "Logic and Conversation". The Logic of Grammar: 64–75.
- Jackson, Frank (1982). "Epiphenomenal Qualia". Philosophical Quarterly. 32 (127): 127–136. doi:10.2307/2960077. JSTOR 2960077.
- Jackson, Frank (1986). "What Mary Didn't Know". Journal of Philosophy. 83 (5): 291–295. doi:10.2307/2026143. JSTOR 2026143.
- Jacquette, Dale (2014). "Toward a Neoaristotelian inherence philosophy of mathematical entities". Studia Neoaristotelica. 11 (2): 159–204. doi:10.5840/studneoar20141126.
- Kastrup, Bernardo (2019). "Analytic Idealism: A consciousness-only ontology". PhilArchive.
- Koons, Robert C. (June 2014). "A New Kalam Argument: Revenge of the Grim Reaper". Noûs. 48 (2): 256–267. doi:10.1111/j.1468-0068.2012.00858.x.
- Kripke, Saul (1979). "A Puzzle about Belief". In Margalit, A. (ed.). Meaning and Use. pp. 239–83. doi:10.1007/978-1-4020-4104-4_13. ISBN 978-1-4020-3263-9.
- Levinson, Jerrold (1979). "Defining art historically". British Journal of Aesthetics. 19 (3): 21–33. doi:10.1093/bjaesthetics/19.3.232.
- Lewis, C. I. (1912). "Implication and the Algebra of Logic". Mind. 21 (84): 522–531. doi:10.1093/mind/XXI.84.522.
- Lewis, David (1986). "Against structural universals". Australasian Journal of Philosophy. 64 (1): 25–46. doi:10.1080/00048408612342211. ISSN 0004-8402.
- Lennox, James G. (2008). "Darwinism and Neo-Darwinism". In Sakar; Plutynski (eds.). A Companion to the Philosophy of Biology. Blackwell.
- Marcus, Ruth Barcan (1946). "A Functional Calculus of First Order Based on Strict Implication". The Journal of Symbolic Logic. 11 (1): 1–16. doi:10.2307/2269159. JSTOR 2269159.
- Marcus, Ruth Barcan (1961). "Modalities and intensional languages". Synthese. 13 (4): 303–322. doi:10.1007/BF00486629.
- McTaggart, J.E. (1908). "The Unreality of Time". Mind. 17 (4): 457–474. doi:10.1093/mind/XVII.4.457.
- Moore, George Edward (1925). Muirhead, J. H. (ed.). "A defence of common sense". Contemporary British Philosophy. Second Series.
- Moore, George Edward (1939). "Proof of an external world". Proceedings of the British Academy. 25 (5): 273–300.
- Moore, G. E. (1903). "The refutation of idealism". Mind. 12 (48): 433–453. doi:10.1093/mind/XII.4.433.
- Mulligan, Kevin; Simons, Peter; Smith, Barry (1984). "Truth-Makers". Philosophy and Phenomenological Research. 44 (3): 287–321. doi:10.2307/2107686. JSTOR 2107686.
- Nagel, Thomas (1972). "War and massacre". Philosophy and Public Affairs. 1 (2): 123–144.
- Nagel, Thomas (1974). "What Is It Like to Be a Bat?". The Philosophical Review. 83 (4): 435–450. doi:10.2307/2183914. JSTOR 2183914.
- Neurath, Otto (1973) [1921]. "Anti-Spengler". Empiricism and Sociology. Vienna Circle Collection. Vol. 1. Dordrecht: D. Reidel. pp. 158–213. doi:10.1007/978-94-010-2525-6_6. ISBN 978-90-277-0259-3. OCLC 780516135.
- Place, U. T. (1956). "Is consciousness a brain process?". British Journal of Psychology. 47: 44–50. doi:10.1111/j.2044-8295.1956.tb00560.x. PMID 13304279.
- Putnam, Hilary (1965). "Brains and behavior". In Shoemaker, Sydney (ed.). Analytical Philosophy.
- Putnam, Hilary (1981). "Brains in a Vat" ( (PDF)). Reason, Truth And History. Cambridge: University of Cambridge. Archived from the original on 6 October 2021.
- Putnam, Hilary (1975). "The meaning of 'meaning'". Minnesota Studies in the Philosophy of Science. 7: 131–193.
- Putnam, Hilary (1973). "Meaning and Reference". Journal of Philosophy. 70 (19): 699–711. doi:10.2307/2025079. JSTOR 2025079.
- Putnam, Hilary (1960). "Minds and Machines". In Hook, Sidney (ed.). Dimensions of Mind. New York: New York University Press. pp. 138–164.
- Quine, W. V. O. (1969). "Epistemology Naturalized". Ontological Relativity and Other Essays. pp. 69–90.
- Quine, W. V. O. (1966). "A logistical approach to the ontological problem". The Ways of Paradox and other essays. p. 197.
- Quine, W. V. O. (1968). "Ontological Relativity". The Journal of Philosophy. 65 (7): 185–212. doi:10.2307/2024305. JSTOR 2024305.
- Quine, W. V. O. (1948). "On What There Is". The Review of Metaphysics. 2 (5): 21–38.
- Quine, W. V. O. (1951). "Two Dogmas of Empiricism". The Philosophical Review. 60 (1): 20–43. doi:10.2307/2181906. JSTOR 2181906.
- Quinton, Anthony (1957). "Properties and Classes" (PDF). Proceedings of the Aristotelian Society. 58: 33–58. doi:10.1093/aristotelian/58.1.33. JSTOR 4544588.
- Radford, Colin; Weston, Michael (January 1975). "How can we be moved by the fate of Anna Karenina?". Proceedings of the Aristotelian Society, Supplementary Volumes. 49: 67–93. doi:10.1093/aristoteliansupp/49.1.67. JSTOR 4106870.
- Ramsey, Frank P.; Moore, G. E. (1927). "VI.—Symposium: Facts and Propositions". Aristotelian Society Supplementary. 7 (1): 153–206. doi:10.1093/aristoteliansupp/7.1.153.
- Rawls, John (1958). "Justice as Fairness". The Philosophical Review. 67 (2): 164–194. doi:10.2307/2182612. JSTOR 2182612.
- Rawls, John (1955). "Two Concepts of Rules". The Philosophical Review. 64 (1): 3–32. doi:10.2307/2182230. JSTOR 2182230.
- Russell, Bertrand (1905). "On Denoting". Mind. 14: 473–493. Archived from the original on 31 March 2006.
- Sellars, Wilfrid (1956). "Empiricism and the philosophy of mind". Minnesota Studies in the Philosophy of Science. 1: 253–329.
- Searle, John (1980). "Minds, brains, and programs". Behavioral and Brain Sciences. 3 (3): 417–57. doi:10.1017/S0140525X00005756.
- Sircello, Guy (1993). "How Is a Theory of the Sublime Possible?". The Journal of Aesthetics and Art Criticism. 51 (4): 541–550. doi:10.1111/1540_6245.jaac51.4.0541.
- Smart, J. J. C. (1959). "Sensations and Brain Processes". The Philosophical Review. 68 (2): 141–156. doi:10.2307/2182164. JSTOR 2182164.
- Sosa, Ernest (1980). "The Raft and the Pyramid: Coherence versus Foundations in the Theory of Knowledge". Midwest Studies in Philosophy. 5: 3–25. doi:10.1111/j.1475-4975.1980.tb00394.x.
- Strawson, P. F. (1950). "On Referring". Mind. 59 (235): 320–344. doi:10.1093/mind/LIX.235.320. JSTOR 2251176.
- Urmson, J. O. (1950). "On grading". Mind. 59 (234): 145–169. doi:10.1093/mind/LIX.234.145.
- Van Gulick, Robert (2004). "Higher-Order Global States HOGS: An Alternative Higher-Order Model of Consciousness". In Gennaro, R. J. (ed.). Higher-Order Theories of Consciousness: An Anthology.
- van Inwagen, Peter (2008). "How to Think about the Problem of Free Will" (PDF). The Journal of Ethics. 12 (3): 337. doi:10.1007/s10892-008-9038-7. ISSN 1572-8609. S2CID 144635471.
- Waismann, Friedrich (1945). "Verifiability". Proceedings of the Aristotelian Society, Supplementary Volumes. 19.
- Walton, Kendall L. (1978). "Fearing fictions". Journal of Philosophy. 75 (1): 5–27. doi:10.2307/2025831. JSTOR 2025831.
- Weitz, Morris (1956). "The Role of Theory in Aesthetics". The Journal of Aesthetics and Art Criticism. 15 (1): 27–35. doi:10.2307/427491. JSTOR 427491.
- Wigner, E. P. (1960). "The unreasonable effectiveness of mathematics in the natural sciences. Richard Courant lecture in mathematical sciences delivered at New York University, May 11, 1959". Communications on Pure and Applied Mathematics. 13 (1): 1–14. Bibcode:1960CPAM...13....1W. doi:10.1002/cpa.3160130102. S2CID 6112252. Archived from the original on 12 February 2021.
- Williams, Bernard (1970). "The self and the future". Philosophical Review. 79 (2): 161–180. doi:10.2307/2183946. JSTOR 2183946.
- Wisdom, John (1936). "Philosophical Perplexity". Proceedings of the Aristotelian Society. 37: 71–88. doi:10.1093/aristotelian/37.1.71. ISSN 0066-7374. JSTOR 4544284.
- Wittgenstein, Ludwig (15 July 1929). "Some Remarks on Logical Form". Proc. Aristot. Soc. Suppl. Vol. 9 (1): 162–171. doi:10.1093/aristoteliansupp/9.1.162.

==== Secondary ====
- Akehurst, Thomas L. (1 March 2009). "Writing history for the ahistorical: Analytic philosophy and its past". History of European Ideas. 35 (1): 116–121. doi:10.1016/j.histeuroideas.2008.09.002. ISSN 0191-6599. S2CID 143566283.
- Alfino, Mark (1991). "Another Look at the Derrida-Searle Debate". Philosophy & Rhetoric. 24 (2): 143–152. JSTOR 40237667.
- Bacrac, Norman (2010). "Epiphenomenalism Explained". Philosophy Now.
- Bobzien, Susanne (2021). Leigh, Fiona (ed.). "Frege plagiarized the Stoics". Themes in Plato, Aristotle, and Hellenistic Philosophy. Keeling Lectures 2011-2018. University of Chicago Press: 149–206.
- Campbell, C. M. (1988). Leith, P.; Ingram, P. (eds.). "The Career of the Concept". The Jurisprudence of Orthodoxy. Routledge: 1–25.
- Casati, Filippo; Fujikawa, Naoya. "Existence". Internet Encyclopedia of Philosophy. ISSN 2161-0002. Archived from the original on 10 August 2023.
- Cooney, Seamus (1973). "Scott's Anonymity—Its Motive and Consequences". Studies in Scottish Literature. 10: 207‒19.
- Desmet, Ronald; Irvine, Andrew David (2022). "Alfred North Whitehead". The Stanford Encyclopedia of Philosophy. Metaphysics Research Lab, Stanford University.
- Farmelant, James (8 August 2009). "G. A. Cohen, 1941-2009". Monthly Review. ISSN 0027-0520. OCLC 241373379. Archived from the original on 27 March 2025.
- Fitelson, Branden; Hawthorne, James (2010). "How Bayesian Confirmation Theory Handles the Paradox of the Ravens". The Place of Probability in Science. Boston Studies in the Philosophy of Science. Vol. 284. Springer. pp. 247–275. doi:10.1007/978-90-481-3615-5_11. ISBN 978-90-481-3614-8.
- Foster, Michael B. (1934). "The Christian doctrine of creation and the rise of modern natural science". Mind. 43 (172): 446–468. doi:10.1093/mind/XLIII.172.446.
- Foster, Michael B. (1935). "Christian theology and modern science of nature (I.)". Mind. 44 (176): 439–466. doi:10.1093/mind/XLIV.176.439.
- Foster, Michael B. (1936). "Christian theology and modern science of nature (II.)". Mind. 45 (177): 1–27. doi:10.1093/mind/XLV.177.1.
- Glock, H. J. (2004). "Was Wittgenstein an Analytic Philosopher?". Metaphilosophy. 35 (4): 419–444. doi:10.1111/j.1467-9973.2004.00329.x.
- Hacker, P. M. S. (4 July 2003). "Obituary: Georg Henrik von Wright". The Guardian.
- Holloway, John (1954). "Can You Play Chess without the Queen?". The Hudson Review. 6 (4): 620–625. doi:10.2307/3847669. ISSN 0018-702X. JSTOR 3847669.
- Inwood, Michael (1999). "Does the Nothing Noth?". Royal Institute of Philosophy Supplement. 44: 271–290. doi:10.1017/S1358246100006767.
- Jacquette, Dale (1987). "Kripke and the Mind-Body Problem". Dialectica. 41 (4): 293–300. doi:10.1111/j.1746-8361.1987.tb00895.x. JSTOR 42970584.
- Jacquette, Dale (1990). "Wittgenstein and the Color Incompatibility Problem". History of Philosophy Quarterly. 7 (3): 353–365. JSTOR 27743943.
- Jiang, Yi; Bai, Tongdong (1 July 2010). "Studies in analytic philosophy in China". Synthese. 175 (1): 3–12. doi:10.1007/s11229-009-9534-8. ISSN 1573-0964.
- Jiang, Yi (2022). Ramharter, Esther (ed.). "The Vienna Circle in China: The Story of Tscha Hung". The Vienna Circle Institute Yearbook. 25: 199–229.
- Jiang, Yi (2024). "Analytic Philosophy in China and the Integration of Modern Chinese Philosophy" (PDF). APA Studies: Asian and Asian American Philosophers and Philosophies. 23 (2): 4–8.
- Jonkers, Peter (2003). "Perspectives on Twentieth Century Philosophy: A Reply to Tom Rockmore". Ars Disputandi. 3: 340–343. doi:10.1080/15665399.2003.10819802. ISSN 1566-5399. S2CID 70060684.
- Konrad, Eva-Maria; Petraschka, Thomas; Werner, Christiana (15 September 2018). "The Paradox of Fiction – A Brief Introduction into Recent Developments, Open Questions, and Current Areas of Research, including a Comprehensive Bibliography from 1975 to 2018" (PDF). JLT Articles (in German). 12 (2): 193–203. doi:10.1515/jlt-2018-0011. ISSN 1862-8990. S2CID 149464237.
- Koopman, Colin (2010). "Bernard Williams on Philosophy's Need for History" (PDF). Review of Metaphysics. 64 (1): 3–30.
- Leftow, Brian (2010). "Swinburne on Divine Necessity". Religious Studies. 46 (2): 141–162. doi:10.1017/S0034412509990370. JSTOR 25676934.
- Lehmann-Haupt, Christopher (29 December 2000). "W. V. Quine, Philosopher Who Analyzed Language and Reality, Dies at 92". The New York Times. ISSN 0362-4331.
- Leiter, Brian (2006). ""Analytic" and "Continental" Philosophy". Archived from the original on 15 November 2006.
- MacIntyre, Alasdair (1987). "John Niemeyer Findlay 1903–1987". Hegel Bulletin. 8 (2): 4–7. doi:10.1017/S0263523200002330.
- Merricks, Trenton (1997). "Fission and Personal Identity over Time". Philosophical Studies. 88 (2): 163–186. doi:10.1023/A:1004210420052. JSTOR 4320793.
- Morgan, Jerry L. (1977). "Linguistics: The Relation of Pragmatics to Semantics and Syntax". Annual Review of Anthropology. 6: 57–67. doi:10.1146/annurev.an.06.100177.000421. ISSN 0084-6570. JSTOR 2949325.
- Nola, Robert (2004). "New Zealand, philosophy in". The Routledge Encyclopedia of Philosophy. doi:10.4324/9780415249126-N107-1.
- O'Grady, Jane (5 October 2010). "Philippa Foot". The Guardian. Archived from the original on 4 November 2019.
- O'Grady, Jane (23 October 2001). "David Lewis". The Guardian. ISSN 0261-3077.
- Parsons, Charles (1995). "Platonism and Mathematical Intuition in Kurt Gödel's Thought". The Bulletin of Symbolic Logic. 1 (1): 44–74. doi:10.2307/420946. JSTOR 420946.
- Peterson, Michael (1991). Reason and Religious Belief: An Introduction to the Philosophy of Religion. OUP.
- Ramsey, Frank P. (1923). "Critical notices". Mind. 32 (128): 465–478. doi:10.1093/mind/XXXII.128.465.
- Sandin, Robert T (1962). "The Founding of the Uppsala School". Journal of the History of Ideas. 23 (4): 496–512. doi:10.2307/2708171. JSTOR 2708171.
- Segre, Michael (1 January 1994). "Peano's Axioms in their Historical Context". Archive for History of Exact Sciences. 48 (3/4): 201–342. doi:10.1007/bf00375085. S2CID 122070745.
- Schardt, Bill; Large, David (15 April 2001). "Wittgenstein Tolstoy and the Gospel in Brief".
- Scott, S. (2010). "Cognitive Science and Philosophy of Language". In Barber, Alex; Stainton, Robert (eds.). Concise Encyclopedia of Philosophy of Language and Linguistics. Oxford: Elsevier. ISBN 978-0-08-096500-0. OCLC 377840723.
- Solum, Lawrence B. (2009). "The Aretaic Turn in American Philosophy of Law". On Philosophy in American Law. Cambridge University Press. p. 122.
- Thomas, Emily (2019). "The Roots of C. D. Broad's Growing Block Theory of Time". Mind. 128 (510): 527–549. doi:10.1093/mind/fzx020.
- Van Gulick, Robert (2006). Kriegel; Williford (eds.). "Mirror Mirror – Is That All?" (PDF). Self-Representational Approaches to Consciousness. MIT Press. Archived from the original (PDF) on 2 October 2008.
- van Heukelom, Jan Siegenbeek; Alberts, Gerard (2000). "Correspondentie David van Dantzig-Gerrit Mannoury : historische notitie SEN". CWI.
- Vaught, Robert L. (1986). "Alfred Tarski's Work in Model Theory". Journal of Symbolic Logic. 51 (4). ASL: 869–882. doi:10.2307/2273900. JSTOR 2273900.
- Weblin, Mark (May 2007). "Idealism in Australia and New Zealand" (PDF). The Northern Line (3). Archived from the original (PDF) on 1 February 2016.
- Willard, Dallas (1980). "Husserl on a Logic that Failed". Philosophical Review. 89 (1): 52–53. doi:10.2307/2184863. JSTOR 2184863.
- Wu, Su; Xu, Jiawei; Zhan, Hao; Wang, Ruoding; Wang, Yucheng; Huang, Junwei; You, Jun; Zhu, Jing (5 February 2024). "Do analytic philosophers in China think differently? A survey and comparative study". Asian Journal of Philosophy. 3 (1): 8. doi:10.1007/s44204-024-00138-x. ISSN 2731-4642.
- Wysocki, Igor (2018). "Freedom and Property Rights – Avoiding Circularity". Dialogi Polityczne. 24: 39–48. doi:10.12775/DP.2018.003.
- Yablo, Stephen; Gallois, Andre (1998). "Does Ontology Rest on a Mistake?". Proceedings of the Aristotelian Society, Supplementary Volumes. 72: 229–261, 263–283. doi:10.1111/1467-8349.00044.
- Zimmerman, Dean (2004). "Prologue". Oxford Studies in Metaphysics. Vol. 1. Oxford University Press.

=== Books ===
==== Primary ====
- Adams, Robert M. (1987). The Virtue of Faith And Other Essays in Philosophical Theology.
- Anscombe, G. E. M. (1957). Intention. Cornell University Press.
- Anscombe, G. E. M.; Geach, Peter (1961). Three philosophers. Cornell University Press.
- Aristotle (2000). Nicomachean Ethics. Hackett.
- Armstrong, D. M. (1978). Nominalism and Realism. Vol. 1: Universals and Scientific Realism. Cambridge University Press.
- Austin, John L. (1962). Marina Sbisá; J. O. Urmson (eds.). How to do things with words. Clarendon Press.
- Austin, John L. (1964) [1962]. Sense and Sensibilia. OUP.
- Ayer, A. J. (2012) [1936]. Language, Truth and Logic. Dover.
- Beall, JC; Restall, Greg (2006). Logical Pluralism. Clarendon Press.
- Benardete, José (1964). Infinity : An Essay in Metaphysics. Clarendon Press.
- Berlin, Isaiah (1958). Two Concepts of Liberty: An Inaugural Lecture Delivered Before the University of Oxford on 31 October 1958. Clarendon Press.
- Bradley, Francis Herbert (1893). Appearance and Reality: A Metaphysical Essay. OUP.
- Brentano, Franz (1973) [1874]. Psychology from An Empirical Standpoint. London: Routledge. ISBN 9780710074256.
- Carnap, Rudolf (2003) [1928]. The Logical Structure of the World. Felix Meiner Verlag. ISBN 978-0-8126-9523-6. LCCN 66013604.
- Carnap, Rudolf (1947). Meaning and Necessity: A Study in Semantics and Modal Logic. Chicago, IL, USA: University of Chicago Press.
- Chisholm, Roderick M. (1966). Theory of knowledge. Prentice-Hall.
- Collingwood, R. G. (1958) [1938]. The Principles of Art. OUP.
- Cohen, Gerald Allan (1978). Karl Marx's theory of history : a defence. OUP. ISBN 978-0-19-827196-3 – via Internet Archive.
- Cohen, Gerald Allan (1988). History, labour, and freedom: themes from Marx. Oxford New York: Clarendon Press Oxford University Press. ISBN 9780198247791.
- Creegan, Charles (1989). Wittgenstein and Kierkegaard: Religion, Individuality and Philosophical Method.
- Craig, W. L. (1979). The Kalām Cosmological Argument. Macmillan Press.
- Dennett, Daniel (1991). Allen Lane (ed.). Consciousness Explained. The Penguin Press. ISBN 978-0-7139-9037-9.
- Dennett, Daniel (1996) [1995]. Darwin's Dangerous Idea: Evolution and the Meaning of Life. Simon & Schuster.
- Dennett, Daniel (1984). Elbow Room: The Varieties of Free Will Worth Wanting. Cambridge, Massachusetts: MIT Press. ISBN 978-0-585-36508-4. OCLC 47010245.
- Dennett, Daniel (1989). The Intentional Stance.
- Dickie, George (1971). Aesthetics, An Introduction. Pegasus. ISBN 978-0-672-63500-7.
- Feyerabend, Paul (1975). Against Method: Outline of an Anarchistic Theory of Knowledge. Humanities Press.
- Field, Hartry (2016) [1980]. Science Without Numbers: A Defense of Nominalism (2nd ed.). OUP. ISBN 978-0-19-877791-5.
- Fodor, Jerry (1975). The Language of Thought. Harvard University Press.
- Fodor, Jerry (1983). Modularity of Mind: An Essay on Faculty Psychology. MIT Press. ISBN 0-262-56025-9.
- Fodor, Jerry; Piattelli-Palmarini, Massimo (2010). What Darwin Got Wrong.
- Frege, Gottlob (1980) [1884]. The Foundations of Arithmetic: A Logico-Mathematical Enquiry Into the Concept of Number. Northwestern University Press. ISBN 0810106051.
- Geach, Peter (1957). Mental Acts: Their Content And Their Objects. Humanities Press.
- Goodman, Nelson (1983) [1955]. Fact, Fiction, and Forecast, Fourth Edition. Harvard University Press.
- Goodman, Nelson (1976) [1968]. Languages of Art. Hackett.
- Haldane, John (2004). Faithful Reason: Essays Catholic and Philosophical. Routledge.
- Hare, R. M. (1963) [1952]. The Language of Morals. OUP.
- Hart, H. L. A. (1961). The Concept of Law. Clarendon Law Series.
- Hayek, F. A. (1952). The Counter-Revolution of Science: Studies on the Abuse of Reason (PDF). Glencoe, Illinois: The Free Press, a corporation – via mises.org.
- Hintikka, Jaakko (1962). Knowledge and Belief: An Introduction to the Logic of the two Notions. Ithaca, NY: Cornell University Press.*
- Hofstadter, Douglas R. (1979). Gödel, Escher, Bach: An Eternal Golden Braid. Basic Books.
- Huemer, Michael (2001). Skepticism and the Veil of Perception.
- Hull, David L.; Ruse, Michael (2007). "Preface". The Cambridge Companion to the Philosophy of Biology. Cambridge University Press. p. xix, xx.
- Hume, David (1993) [1748]. An enquiry concerning human understanding; [with] A letter from a gentleman to his friend in Edinburgh; [and] An abstract of a Treatise of human nature. Hackett Publishing Company.
- Hume, David (2004) [1740]. A Treatise of Human Nature. Penguin Books.
- Kant, Immanuel (1998) [1781]. Critique of Pure Reason. Cambridge University Press.
- Kramer, Matthew (1999). In defense of legal positivism: law without trimmings. OUP.
- Kripke, Saul (1980). Naming and Necessity.
- Kripke, Saul (1982). Wittgenstein on rules and private language: an elementary exposition. Cambridge: Harvard University Press.
- Kuhn, Thomas S. (1962). The Structure of Scientific Revolutions (1st ed.). University of Chicago Press. LCCN 62019621.
- Langer, Susanne (1953). Feeling and Form: A Theory of Art.
- Lewis, Clarence Irving (1956) [1929]. Mind and the World-Order: Outline of a Theory of Knowledge. Dover.
- Lewis, David (1973). Counterfactuals. Malden, Mass: Blackwell.
- Lewis, David (1986). On the Plurality of Worlds. Blackwell. OCLC 12236763.
- Locke, John (2008) [1690]. An Essay Concerning Human Understanding. OUP.
- Locke, John (1988) [1689]. Two treatises of government. Cambridge University Press.
- MacIntyre, Alasdair (1981). After Virtue: A Study in Moral Theory.
- Mackie, J. L. (1978). Ethics : inventing right and wrong. Harmondsworth, Middlesex : Penguin Books. ISBN 978-0-14-021957-9 – via Internet Archive.
- Mackie, J. L. (1982). The Miracle of Theism: Arguments For and Against the Existence of God.
- Maudlin, Tim (2007). The Metaphysics Within Physics. Clarendon Press.
- McGinn, Colin (2002). The Making of a Philosopher: My Journey through Twentieth-Century Philosophy. HarperCollins.
- Moore, George Edward (1903). Principia ethica. Dover.
- Mothersill, Mary (1984). Beauty Restored. Clarendon Press.
- Nagel, Ernest (1961). The Structure of Science: Problems in the Logic of Scientific Explanation.
- Nagel, Thomas (1979). "Panpsychism". Mortal questions. pp. 181–195.
- Nielsen, Kai; Phillips, D. Z. (2005). Wittgensteinian Fideism?. SCM Press.
- Nozick, Robert (1974). Anarchy, state, and utopia. Basic Books.
- Nozick, Robert (1981). Philosophical explanations. Harvard University Press.
- Parfit, Derek (1984). Reasons and Persons. OUP, UK.
- Penrose, Roger (2007) [2004]. The Road to Reality: A Complete Guide to the Laws of the Universe.
- Phillips, D. Z. (1999). Philosophy's Cool Place. Cornell University Press.
- Plantinga, Alvin (1967). God and Other Minds: A Study of the Rational Justification of Belief in God. Cornell University Press.
- Plantinga, Alvin (1974). The Nature of Necessity. Clarendon Press. Bibcode:1974nane.book.....P.
- Plantinga, Alvin (1993). Warrant: The Current Debate. OUP USA.
- Plantinga, Alvin (2000). Warranted Christian Belief. OUP.
- Plantinga, Alvin (1993). Warrant and Proper Function. OUP.
- Plato (2000). The Republic. Cambridge University Press.
- Plato (1992). Burnyeat, Myles (ed.). Theaetetus. Hackett.
- Popper, Karl (2002) [1959]. The Logic of Scientific Discovery. Routledge. ISBN 978-0-415-27844-7.
- Popper, Karl (2012) [1945]. The Open Society and Its Enemies. Taylor & Francis.
- Priest, Graham (2005). Doubt Truth to be a Liar. doi:10.1093/0199263280.001.0001. ISBN 0-19-926328-0.
- Prior, Arthur (1967). Past, present and future. Clarendon.
- Pruss, Alexander R (2006). The Principle of Sufficient Reason: A Reassessment. Cambridge University Press.
- Quine, W. V. O. (1953). From a Logical Point of View. Cambridge: Harvard University Press.
- Quine, W. V. O. (1970). Ullian, J. S. (ed.). The web of belief. Random House.
- Quine, W. V. O. (2010) [1960]. Word and Object. MIT Press.
- Rawls, John (1999) [1971]. A Theory of Justice: Revised Edition. Harvard University Press. doi:10.2307/j.ctvkjb25m.
- Russell, Bertrand (1946). Schilpp, Paul Arthur (ed.). The Philosophy of Bertrand Russell.
- Russell, Bertrand (1956). "Portraits from Memory". Portraits from memory: and other essays. Simon & Schuster.
- Russell, Bertrand (1903). "Principles of Mathematics". Nature. 68 (1766): 410. Bibcode:1903Natur..68..410T. doi:10.1038/068410a0.
- Russell, Bertrand (1912). The Problems of Philosophy.
- Russell, Bertrand (2009) [1918]. The Philosophy of Logical Atomism. United Kingdom: Taylor & Francis.
- Russell, Bertrand; Whitehead, Alfred North (1910). Principia Mathematica. Vol. 1 (1st ed.). Cambridge: Cambridge University Press. hdl:2027/miun.aat3201.0001.001. JFM 41.0083.02. LCCN a11002789.
- Ryle, Gilbert (2009) [1949]. The Concept of Mind: 60th Anniversary Edition. Routledge.
- Searle, John (1995). The Construction of Social Reality. Free Press.
- Sellars, Wilfrid (1962). "Philosophy and the Scientific Image of Man". In Colodny, Robert (ed.). Frontiers of Science and Philosophy. Pittsburgh, PA: University of Pittsburgh Press. pp. 35–78.
- Shafer-Landau, Russ (2003). Moral realism: a defence. OUP.
- Sidgwick, Henry (1981) [1874]. The methods of ethics. Hackett.
- Singer, Peter (1975). Animal Liberation: A New Ethics for Our Treatment of Animals.
- Sircello, Guy (1989). Love and Beauty. Princeton University Press.
- Sircello, Guy (1975). A New Theory of Beauty. Princeton University Press.
- Stevenson, Charles Leslie (1944). Ethics and Language. Yale University Press.
- Strawson, P. F. (1959). Individuals. Routledge.
- Swinburne, Richard (1977). The Coherence of Theism. OUP.
- Swinburne, Richard (2004) [1979]. The existence of God. OUP.
- Swinburne, Richard (1981). Faith and Reason. OUP UK.
- Tatarkiewicz, Władysław (1976). Analysis of happiness.
- Tatarkiewicz, Władysław (1980). A History of Six Ideas: an essay in aesthetics. PWN/Polish Scientific Publishers. ISBN 978-8301008246.
- Urmson, J. O. (1968). The Emotive Theory of Ethics. Routledge.
- van Brakel, Jap (2000). Philosophy of Chemistry: Between the Manifest and the Scientific Image. Leuven University Press.
- van Inwagen, Peter (1983). An Essay on Free Will. Clarendon Press. ISBN 978-0-19-824924-5.
- van Inwagen, Peter; Zimmerman, Dean W., eds. (1991). Metaphysics: The Big Questions. Wiley-Blackwell.
- Whitehead, Alfred North (1957) [1929]. David Ray Griffin; Donald W. Sherburne (eds.). Process and reality. New York: Macmillan.
- Williams, Bernard (1985). Ethics and the Limits of Philosophy. Fontana.
- Williams, Bernard (2006). Philosophy as a Humanistic Discipline. Princeton University Press.
- Williamson, Timothy (2000). Knowledge and its Limits. OUP. ISBN 0-19-825043-6.
- Winch, Peter (2002) [1958]. The Idea of a Social Science: And Its Relation to Philosophy. Taylor & Francis.
- Wisdom, John (1952). Other minds. Blackwell.
- Wisdom, John (1965). Paradox and discovery. Blackwell.
- Wittgenstein, Ludwig (1984). Culture and Value. University of Chicago Press.
- Wittgenstein, Ludwig (1972). On Certainty. HarperCollins.
- Wittgenstein, Ludwig (1953). G. E. M. Anscombe (ed.). Philosophical Investigations. New York, NY, USA: Wiley-Blackwell.
- Wittgenstein, Ludwig (1922). Tractatus Logico-Philosophicus.
- Wolterstorff, Nicholas (2015). Art Rethought: The Social Practices of Art. OUP.
- Wright, Crispin (1983). Frege's conception of numbers as objects. Aberdeen University Press.
- Zalta, Edward N. (1983). Abstract Objects: An Introduction to Axiomatic Metaphysics (PDF). Dordrecht: D. Reidel.

==== Secondary ====
- Amico, Robert (1995). The Problem of the Criterion. Bloomsbury.
- Baillie, James (1997). "Introduction to Bertrand Russell". Contemporary Analytic Philosophy. Prentice Hall.
- Beaney, Michael, ed. (2013). The Oxford Handbook of the History of Analytic Philosophy. OUP. ISBN 978-0-19-923884-2.
- Będkowski, Marcin, ed. (2020). Formal and Informal Methods in Philosophy. BRILL. ISBN 978-90-04-42050-2.
- Berglund, Stefan (1995). Human and Personal Identity. Lund University Press.
- Bonjour, Laurence (2010). "Recent Work on the Internalism–Externalism Controversy". In Dancy; Sosa; Steup (eds.). A Companion to Epistemology, Second Edition. Wiley-Blackwell. p. 33.
- Borradori, Giovanna (1994). The American Philosopher: Conversations with Quine, Davidson, Putnam, Nozick, Danto, Rorty, Cavell, MacIntyre, Kuhn. University of Chicago Press. ISBN 978-0-226-06647-9.
- Cohen, L. J. (1986). The Dialogue of Reason: An Analysis of Analytical Philosophy. OUP.
- Cotnoir, A. J.; Varzi, Achille C. (2021). Mereology. OUP.
- Critchley, Simon (2001). Continental philosophy a very short introduction. OUP. OCLC 1200924441.
- Drayson, Zoe (2021). "Neurath's Boat". In de Cruz, Helen (ed.). Philosophy Illustrated: 40 Thought Experiments to Broaden Your Mind.
- Dummett, Michael (1993). The Origins of Analytical Philosophy. Cambridge, MA: Harvard University Press. ISBN 978-0-674-64473-1.
- Everett, Anthony; Hofweber, Thomas, eds. (2000). Empty Names, Fiction and the Puzzle of Non-Existence. Cambridge University Press.
- Gamow, George (2012) [1947]. One Two Three . . . Infinity: Facts and Speculations of Science. Dover.
- Glock, H. J. (2008). What is Analytic Philosophy?. Cambridge University Press. ISBN 978-0-521-87267-6.
- Godfrey-Smith, Peter (2003). Theory and Reality. ISBN 0-226-30062-5.
- Grayling, A. C., ed. (1998). Philosophy 2: Further through the Subject. OUP.
- Grayling, A. C. (2001). Wittgenstein: A Very Short Introduction.
- Geuss, Raymond (1981). The Idea of a Critical Theory: Habermas and the Frankfurt School. Cambridge University Press.
- Guyer, Paul (2014). A History of Modern Aesthetics: The twentieth century. Cambridge University Press. ISBN 9781107038059.
- Haaparanta, Leila; Niiniluoto, Ilkka, eds. (2016). Analytic Philosophy in Finland. Brill.
- Hales, Steven D. (2002). "A Brief Introduction to the Nature and Origins of Analytic Philosophy". In Hales, Steven D. (ed.). Analytic philosophy : classic readings. Belmont, CA: Wadsworth/Thomson Learning. pp. 1–10. ISBN 978-0-534-51277-4.
- Harris, James Franklin (2002). Analytic philosophy of religion. Dordrecht: Kluwer. ISBN 978-1-4020-0530-5.ISSN 1568-1556
- Heyting, Frieda; Lenzen, Dieter; White, John (2002). Methods in Philosophy of Education. New York: Routledge. ISBN 978-0-415-24260-8.
- Hitchcock, Christopher (2015). "Lewis on Causation". A Companion to David Lewis. Oxford, UK: John Wiley & Sons. pp. 295–311. doi:10.1002/9781118398593.ch19. ISBN 978-1-118-39859-3.
- Hung, Tscha (1945). The Philosophy of the Vienna Circle. Commercial Press.
- Hylton, Peter (1990). Russell, Idealism, and the Emergence of Analytic Philosophy. OUP.
- Janssen-Lauret, Frederique; Kemp, Gary, eds. (2016). Quine and His Place in History.
- Kane, Robert (2005). A Contemporary Introduction to Free Will. OUP. ISBN 978-0-19-514970-8.
- Kenny, Anthony (1973). Wittgenstein.
- Kivy, Peter (2004). "Introduction: Aesthetics Today". The Blackwell Guide to Aesthetics. Blackwell.
- Kuusela, Oskari (2011). Key Terms in Ethics. London: Continuum International Publishing Group. ISBN 978-1-4411-6610-4.
- Laërtius, Diogenes. "Pythagoreans: Pythagoras" . Lives of the Eminent Philosophers. Vol. 2:8. Translated by Hicks, Robert Drew (Two volume ed.). Loeb Classical Library. § 14.
- Lapointe, S. (2011). Bolzano's Theoretical Philosophy: An Introduction.
- Lowe, E. J. (2005). "Existence". In Honderich, Ted (ed.). The Oxford Companion to Philosophy. OUP. ISBN 978-0-19-926479-7. Archived from the original on 1 February 2024.
- Loux, Michael J.; Crisp, Thomas M. (2017). Metaphysics: A Contemporary Introduction (4 ed.). Routledge. ISBN 978-1-138-63933-1.
- Luft, Sebastian (2019). Philosophie lehren: Ein Buch zur philosophischen Hochschuldidaktik (in German). Felix Meiner Verlag. ISBN 978-3-7873-3766-8.
- Maher, Chauncey (2012). The Pittsburgh School of Philosophy: Sellars, McDowell, Brandom. Taylor & Francis.
- Malcolm, Norman (1966) [1958]. Ludwig Wittgenstein: A Memoir, with a Biographical Sketch by Georg Henrik Von Wright. OUP.
- Martinich, A. P.; Sosa, David, eds. (2001). A Companion to Analytic Philosophy. Blackwell Companions to Philosophy. Blackwell. doi:10.1002/9780470998656. ISBN 978-0-631-21415-1.
- Mock, James (2020). "David Hume and Guy Sircello's Aesthetics". In Matthis, Michael (ed.). The Beautiful, the Sublime, and the Grotesque: The Subjective Turn in Aesthetics from the Enlightenment to the Present. pp. 29–40.
- Mautner, Thomas, ed. (2005). "Analytic philosophy". The Penguin Dictionary of Philosophy.
- Milkov, Nikolay (2013). "The Berlin group and the Vienna circle: Affinities and divergences". The Berlin Group and the philosophy of logical empiricism. Boston Studies in the Philosophy and History of Science. Vol. 273. pp. 3–32. doi:10.1007/978-94-007-5485-0_1. ISBN 978-94-007-5484-3.
- Monk, Ray (1990). Ludwig Wittgenstein: The Duty of Genius. Free Press.
- Oppy, Graham; Trakakis, Nick, eds. (2014). History of Philosophy in Australia and New Zealand.
- Palmer, Clare (1998). Environmental Ethics and Process Thinking. Clarendon Press. ISBN 978-0-19-826952-6. Archived from the original on 2 April 2024.
- Perry, John (2002). Identity, Personal Identity & the Self. Hackett.
- Prior, Arthur, ed. (1961). "History of Logic". Cambridge Encyclopedia of Philosophy. 4: 541.
- Rahman, Shahid; Symons, John; Gabbay, Dov M.; Bendegem, Jean Paul van (2009). Logic, Epistemology, and the Unity of Science. Dordrecht: Springer Science & Business Media. ISBN 978-1-4020-2807-6.
- Ramsey, Frank P. (2000), Richard Bevan Braithwaite (ed.), The foundations of mathematics and other logical essays, vol. 5, Routledge, ISBN 978-0-415-22546-5
- Russell, Bertrand (2004) [1945]. History of Western Philosophy. Routledge.
- Schwartz, Stephen P. (2012). A Brief History of Analytic Philosophy: From Russell to Rawls. John Wiley & Sons. ISBN 978-1-118-27172-8.
- Scruton, Roger (2012). Modern Philosophy: An Introduction and Survey. Bloomsbury.
- Searle, John (2003). "Contemporary Philosophy in the United States". In Bunnin, N.; Tsui-James, E. P (eds.). The Blackwell Companion to Philosophy. Blackwell.
- Shapiro, Ian (2003). The Moral Foundations of Politics (First ed.). New Haven: Yale University Press. ISBN 0-300-07907-9.
- Soames, Scott (2003). Philosophical Analysis in the Twentieth Century: Volume 1, The Dawn of Analysis. Princeton University Press.
- Soames, Scott (2005). Philosophical Analysis in the Twentieth Century: Volume 2: The Age of Meaning. Princeton University Press.
- Sosa, Ernest (2018). Epistemology. Princeton University Press.
- Solomon, William D. (2018). "Early Virtue Ethics". The Oxford Handbook of Virtue. OUP. pp. 303–335.
- Stalmaszczyk, Piotr, ed. (2021). The Cambridge Handbook of the Philosophy of Language. Cambridge University Press.
- Stroll, Avrum (2000). Twentieth-Century Analytic Philosophy. Columbia University Press.
- Taavitsainen, Irma; Jucker, Andreas H. (22 September 2010). "1. Trends and developments in historical pragmatics". Historical Pragmatics. De Gruyter Mouton. pp. 3–32. doi:10.1515/9783110214284.1.3. ISBN 978-3-11-021428-4.
- Urmson, J. O. (1956). Philosophical analysis : its development between the two World Wars. Internet Archive. Oxford: Clarendon Press.*Vienne, J.M. (1997). Philosophie analytique et histoire de la philosophie: actes du colloque (Université de Nantes, 1991). Problèmes et controverses (in French). J. Vrin. ISBN 978-2-7116-1312-0.
- Wain, Kenneth (1995). The Value Crisis: An Introduction to Ethics. Malta University.
- Wolff, Jonathan (1991). Robert Nozick: Property, Justice and the Minimal State. Stanford, California: Stanford University Press. ISBN 0-8047-1856-3.
- Yates, Peter (3 November 2011). "The Three Metamorphoses and Reality". In Luchte, James (ed.). Nietzsche's Thus Spoke Zarathustra: Before Sunrise. Bloomsbury Publishing. ISBN 978-1-4411-1845-5.
- Zahavi, Dan (2016). "Analytic and Continental Philosophy: From Duality Through Pluralism To (Some Kind of) Unity". In Rinofner-Kreidl, Sonja; Wiltsche, H.A. (eds.). Analytic and Continental Philosophy: Methods and Perspectives. Proceedings of the 37th International Wittgenstein Symposium. Publications of the Austrian Ludwig Wittgenstein Society – New Series. De Gruyter. ISBN 978-3-11-044887-0.
