= Working from Within: The Nature and Development of Quine's Naturalism =

2018 philosophy book by Sander Verhaegh

Working from Within
- Author: Sander Verhaegh
- Cover artist: Marjorie Boynton Quine
- Language: English
- Subjects: History of philosophy; Willard Van Orman Quine; Naturalism
- Publisher: Oxford University Press
- Publication date: 2018
- Publication place: United States
- Pages: 218
- ISBN: 978-0-190-91315-1
- OCLC: 1039630975
- Dewey Decimal: 191
- LC Class: B945.Q54
- Website: Oxford Academic

Working from Within: The Nature and Development of Quine's Naturalism is a 2018 book by Dutch philosopher and historian of analytic philosophy Sander Verhaegh. Released at a time in which there was increasing work done on Willard Van Orman Quine in the history of analytic philosophy, the book was the first to provide a full account of the historical development of his naturalism. It was also the first book to use the extensive archive materials on Quine at Harvard University's Houghton Library.

In the book, Verhaegh argues that Quine's naturalism can be best characterised as a commitment to "working from within" and a rejection of transcendental viewpoints. He also argues that the development of Quine's naturalism can be better understood by examining the obstacles that Quine faced writing an unpublished book entitled Sign and Object and the ways in which he overcame them. The book was academically well-received, gaining especial praise for the quality of its historical scholarship and use of archival sources, but also faced some critiques regarding its interpretations and relevancy to contemporary philosophy.

== Background ==
=== History of analytic philosophy ===
In the decades preceding the release of the book, work in the history of analytic philosophy focused on figures important in the early development of the tradition such as Gottlob Frege, Bertrand Russell, Ludwig Wittgenstein, and Rudolf Carnap, with later philosophers such as Quine rarely covered. However, during the time of the release of the book, more works on such philosophers were being released, including works focusing on the development of Quine's thought. Nonetheless, whilst previous historical works on Quine solely utilised published materials by Quine and secondary literature on his thought to inform their conclusions, Working from Within was the first to also use the hundreds of archived documents on Quine at Harvard University's Houghton Library.

The book was also unique compared to other work on Quine at the time for its focus on his naturalism instead of his criticisms of the analytic–synthetic distinction; according to Gary Ebbs and Sean Morris, it was the first historically-informed and full account of Quine's naturalism. The book is written by Sander Verhaegh, who Rogério P. Severo described as having "breathed a wave of fresh air into the study of Quine's philosophy" in the years preceding the release of the book, and incorporates reworked versions of six of his papers that had been previously published from 2014 onwards.

=== Quine's philosophy ===
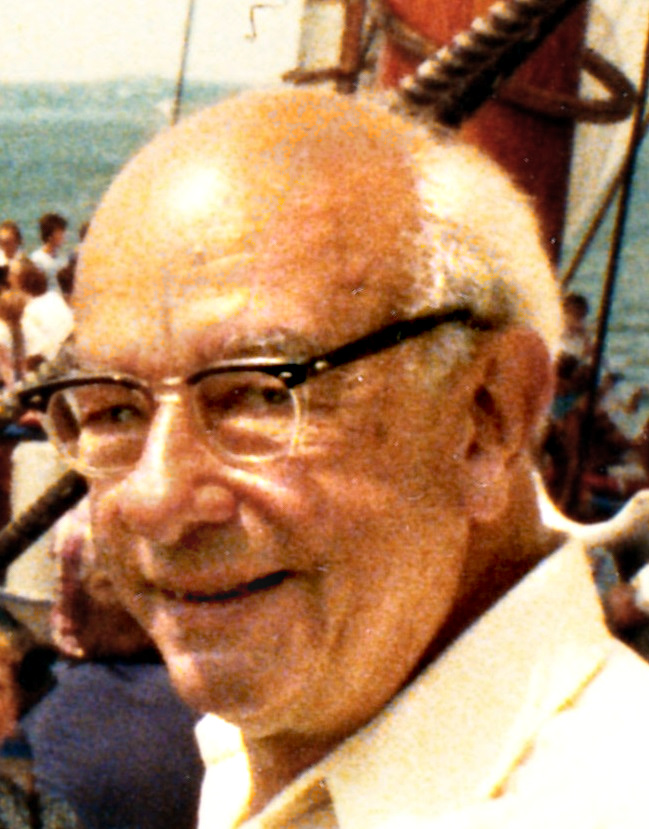
Quine in 1980

As the subject of the book's focus is the nature and development of Quine's thought, it touches on various aspects of his philosophy, including his naturalism, naturalized epistemology and metaphysics, and holism. Quine described his naturalism as "the recognition that it is within science itself, and not in some prior philosophy, that reality is to be identified and described". He objected to attempts to identify the world through a prior philosophy because he thought that there is no such thing as a purely philosophical standpoint that can step outside of, and thereby justify, the scientific viewpoint.

Instead, Quine characterised philosophy as "natural science trained upon itself" and argued that philosophical questions should be answered by utilising the empirical tools of science. This view led Quine to believe that traditional philosophical disciplines should be "naturalized". In the case of epistemology, this meant reframing the question of knowledge as a question of finding a scientific account of how people come to form an understanding of the world. In the case of metaphysics, this meant turning towards the best scientific theories to determine what there is best reason to believe exists.

Another important aspect of Quine's thought was his rejection of the analytic–synthetic distinction; that is, the distinction between statements true in virtue of meaning alone and statements true in virtue of the way the world is. He argued that attempts to define analyticity in terms of meaning, synonymy or semantical rules of language are circular and so fail. Quine's alternative explanation for the truths of disciplines thought to be analytic such as mathematics and logic was his holism. This is the view that individual sentences do not imply predictions about what should be observed, but must be embedded within a larger theory. Given that logic and mathematics contribute favourably to an overall framework of the world, it is justified to believe in them. Therefore, according to Quine, there is no need to draw a distinction between analytic and synthetic to explain these fields.

== Summary ==
The book begins with a short introduction. It gives an overview of the history of naturalistic philosophy prior to Quine, the historical context of analytic philosophy under which Quine's naturalism developed, and the influence of his naturalism within later contemporary philosophy. The rest of the book is split into two parts, one on the nature of Quine's naturalism and the other on its historical development and the reactions it evoked at the time. The final chapter is a conclusion in which Verhaegh summarises some of the key points of the book. In addition, there is an appendix containing several previously unpublished transcriptions of archival materials which Verhaegh utilised in his research.

=== Part I ===
Part I is split into three chapters which cover Quine's naturalized epistemology (chapter 2), his views on metaphysics and ontology (chapter 3), and his naturalism's commitment to working from within the scientific point of view (chapter 4).

==== Chapter 2 ====
In chapter 2, Verhaegh discusses an interpretation of Quine that says he made an "argument from despair", which claims that naturalized epistemology should replace traditional epistemology because all traditional attempts to secure a foundational justification of science had failed. Verhaegh argues that this interpretation conceals a stronger and more fundamental objection to traditional epistemology that can be found in Quine's work.

Verhaegh claims that Quine also argued that traditional epistemology was "flawed from the beginning" because it assumes that there is a science-independent viewpoint from which to justify knowledge, which Quine thought to be impossible; according to Quine, attempts to take such a viewpoint necessarily presuppose scientific knowledge. For example, Verhaegh makes the case that as Quine's naturalism developed, he became convinced that attempting to reduce scientific knowledge to knowledge obtained through sense data necessarily presupposes prior scientific knowledge that justifies the belief in sense data, or in other words that sense data are "not epistemologically prior to but dependent on our best scientific theories of the world".

==== Chapter 3 ====
In chapter 3, Verhaegh focuses on Quine's famous debates with Rudolf Carnap regarding metaphysics. Quine has often been viewed as saving metaphysics from logical positivists such as Carnap who viewed metaphysical claims as necessarily meaningless. However, Verhaegh argues that Quine's views on metaphysics are more subtle than often presented. Whilst he does blur the line between scientific sense and metaphysical nonsense, he is still critical of many metaphysical questions which he views as "useless" to the scientific project.

According to Verhaegh, Quine was not attempting to save metaphysics from Carnap in their debates, but was criticising his distinction between theoretical questions internal to a linguistic framework and practical questions regarding which linguistic framework to adopt. According to Verhaegh's reading of Quine, the choice of which linguistic framework or theory to accept is guided by both pragmatic and theoretical considerations. This is because the importance of different pragmatic concerns depends to some degree on the way the world is thought to be.

Overall, Verhaegh views Quine and Carnap's views as being far more alike than often claimed, with both dismissing traditional metaphysics (as either useless or meaningless), but argues that Quine made room for a naturalized metaphysics within science by undermining Carnap's theoretical–practical distinction. Quine's views about scepticism can also be viewed through the lens of his views on the distinction between internal and external questions. For Quine, as radical scepticism stands outside of the scientific viewpoint, it is useless for the progress of science and so can be dismissed. However, forms of scepticism within the scientific viewpoint can provide challenges that further science and are therefore useful.

==== Chapter 4 ====
In chapter 4, Verhaegh details his account of Quine's naturalism as a commitment to "work from within". Verhaegh claims that Quine's naturalism is built up of a rejection of transcendental, extra-scientific viewpoints and a commitment to working from within a viewpoint that is immanent to science. Quine's commitment to a rejection of transcendental viewpoints was due to his conviction that it is impossible to ask what there is or what the world is like without adopting some theory of the world. And his commitment to working within immanent viewpoints reasoned that if a theory of the world is required, one must simply start from within the theory they already have and work to improve on it as best they can. These two theses are in turn supported by Quine's empiricism, holism, and realism. In this chapter, Verhaegh also outlines how Quine's naturalism supports his other philosophical views, including his rejection of instrumentalism and acceptance of a deflationary theory of truth.

=== Part II ===
Part II, like part I, is composed of three chapters, and focuses on the historical development of Quine's naturalism. They cover Quine's early views (chapter 5) and the obstacles that he faced in formulating his mature naturalism, including his struggles with the analytic–synthetic distinction (chapter 6) and the connection between science, philosophy, and common sense (chapter 7).

==== Chapter 5 ====
Verhaegh argues in chapter 5 that Quine's early views contained some elements of his more mature thought but that he still had to overcome some philosophical obstacles to fully develop his naturalism. He presents early work done by Quine such as his undergraduate thesis and an early version of his book Word and Object—which was at that time titled Sign and Object—to support this argument. Verhaegh states that since beginning work on Sign and Object in 1941, Quine faced serious problems in his attempt to complete the book and he eventually stopped working on it in 1946. Specifically, whilst he had already had concerns regarding the analytic–synthetic distinction, he had not yet developed "a comprehensive view about language, meaning, and the nature of logical and mathematical knowledge" and so could offer no alternative.

Furthermore, he struggled with forming a satisfying epistemology and with formulating his views regarding the "problem of epistemic priority". This was the problem posed by phenomenalism which argues that sense experience is epistemically prior to the physical objects of science, and so provide the more sound foundations for knowledge. According to Verhaegh, at the time of writing Sign and Object, Quine had not yet developed his response that sensory experience is not epistemically prior to science but dependent on it, and it was not until 1951 that he developed such a view. Verhaegh claims that understanding these obstacles in Quine's intellectual development provides a greater understanding of the eventual development of his mature views in "Two Dogmas of Empiricism" and later Word and Object.

==== Chapter 6 ====
Chapter 6 focuses on Quine's evolving views on the analytic–synthetic distinction up until his eventual abandonment of the distinction with his 1951 article "Two Dogmas of Empiricism". Verhaegh claims that to understand what led Quine to abandon the distinction depends on the answers to three questions: when did Quine begin looking for a behaviorist definition of analyticity, when did he stop looking for such a definition, and when did he conclude that there was no need to find a definition of analyticity? The chapter utilises what was at that point new evidence to argue for the claim that Quine already believed in 1943 that Carnap's attempts to define analyticity in formal semantical terms were unsuccessful, and it was at this point that he began looking for a behaviorist definition.

However, according to Verhaegh, it was only in 1949 that Quine realised that a "wide-scoped" holism would eliminate the epistemological requirement for an analytic–synthetic distinction. Such a wide-scoped holism claims that scientific prediction draws on science as a whole, including areas of study that were commonly thought to be analytic such as mathematics and logic. This development of Quine's views culminates with his "Two Dogmas of Empiricism" in which he argues that there is no no behavioristicaly acceptable definition of analyticity, and that if his holism is right, then there is no need for such a distinction between analytic and synthetic anyway.

==== Chapter 7 ====
Chapter 7 deals with the development and reception of Quine's views on the distinction between science and philosophy from when he wrote the first draft of Word and Object in 1953 up until 1968, when he first used the term "naturalism" to label his philosophy. According to Verhaegh, Quine had the basic features of his naturalism in the early 1950s, specifically that "there are no transcendental, distinctively philosophical perspectives on science and we cannot draw a strict distinction between matters of fact and matters of language — between the analytic and the synthetic".

However, Verhaegh claims that Quine was at that time not as concerned with the connection between science and philosophy as he was with the connection between science and ordinary language. Verhaegh details how throughout the 1950s, Quine became increasingly interested in experimental psychology and behavioral studies, and shifted his focus towards an emphasis on the view that philosophy is far more akin to science than key philosophers at the time believed, culminating in his 1960 book Word and Object. According to Verhaegh, it was the mixed response to this book and misunderstandings of the views presented in it that led Quine to conclude that he needed "a distinctive 'ism' to summarize his core philosophical perspective." Verhaegh argues that Quine then adopted the term "naturalism" from his readings of John Dewey's Experience and Nature in preparation for a 1968 lecture on Dewey at Columbia University.

== Reception ==
=== Quality of historical scholarship ===
Working from Within was praised in academic reviews for its historical scholarship and use of archival sources. In a review in the British Journal for the History of Philosophy, Robert Sinclair described the book as "masterful", "authoritative" and "the most thorough account available of Quine’s philosophical development". A review by Adam Tamas Tuboly, published in Metascience, said that the book "masterly combines a deeply informative and clear presentation of Quine's views with a detailed and revealing reconstruction of the numerous archive materials" and gave especial praise to Part II which Tuboly called "a real masterpiece of historical scholarship".

Gary Ebbs reviewed Working from Within in Notre Dame Philosophical Reviews, praising Verhaegh's "exemplary use of archival sources" which he said allowed for the creation of a "rich and illuminating account" of Quine's thought. Ebbs argued that one of the "great merits" of the book was its use of such materials to justify interpretations of Quine instead of taking standard accounts for granted. Ebbs felt that the book's account of Quine's adoption of the term "naturalism" in the 1960s after having already developed the tenets of his philosophy was a major scholarly and philosophical contribution. He also cited its portrayal of the way in which Quine's naturalism challenges popular philosophical notions such as the apriority of philosophy as another important contribution. He summarised the book as "an impressive scholarly and philosophical achievement" which "sets a new standard in Quine scholarship."

Jan Arreman praised Verhaegh's use of archival materials in Philosophy in Review, calling the book "detailed and historically informed" as well as "engaging and thought provoking". In a review in the Journal of the History of Philosophy, Sean Morris states "Verhaegh's extensive use of unpublished material from the Quine archives [is] itself an important contribution … Not only does this yield a better understanding of Quine, but it also shows generally how much can be gained through thorough archival research." He called the book "excellent" and said that he "cannot recommend [it] highly enough". In a review published in Erkenntnis, Rogério P. Severo praised Verhaegh's "excellent use" of archival materials and called the inclusion of transcriptions of archived documents in the appendix "quite illuminating".

=== Interpretations of Quine ===
Most reviewers were broadly supportive of Verhaegh's interpretations of Quine, but some took issue with particular examples. In his review, Ebbs proposed alternative interpretations of the archival evidence Verhaegh puts forward in defense of his interpretation on the differences between Quine and Carnap on analyticity, on the evolution of Quine's views about sense data and epistemic priority, and on the relationship between Quine and Carnap on the science–philosophy distinction. Nonetheless, Ebbs notes that although he has differing interpretations on these questions, there are "many more parts of the book -- too many to list" that he agrees with.

Ali Hossein Khani reviewed the book in The Philosophical Quarterly, calling it a "rich and stimulating book". Nonetheless, he argued that Verhaegh presents conflicting statements on whether or not Quine's arguments against the analytic–synthetic distinction committed him to the idea that a behavioristically acceptable definition of analyticity was possible. He also stated that Verhaegh rarely utilises his account of Quine's naturalism to elucidate Quine's other views, including his physicalism, behaviorism, and views on underdetermination and the indeterminacy of translation. Overall, Khani says that these problems "do not affect the merits of Verhaegh's book, which is an excellent attempt to provide a very delicate historical as well as systematic investigation of the evolution of naturalism in Quine's works."

Severo praised the book's clarity and "refreshingly reasonable" reconstructions of Quine's views. He argued that "Perhaps its only drawback is that it engages the topics exclusively from an insider's perspective" in that it was written "primarily for Quine scholars" and as such didn't highlight some of the possible drawbacks of Quine's naturalism.

=== Relevance to contemporary philosophy ===
Some reviewers felt that the book did not offer ideas relevant to contemporary philosophy. Tuboly contrasted Working from Within with Thomas Uebel's book on Otto Neurath, Overcoming Logical Positivism from Within, arguing that whilst Verhaegh provides a greater understanding of the evolution in Quine's thought, he doesn't succeed in providing new ideas relevant to contemporary philosophy. Tuboly concludes that the book is "a very nice step, though only one of the first steps, [towards an] integrated history and philosophy within analytic philosophy."

Similarly, Sinclair argued that Verhaegh doesn't make clear the philosophical significance for contemporary philosophy of his account of Quine's naturalism—specifically, he argues that it isn't made clear whether a commitment to Quine's naturalism entails a commitment to some of Quine's more controversial viewpoints—but he also states "[s]uch concerns do not detract from the value of this impressive work."

Others were disappointed that the book did not cover more recent responses to Quine or post-Quinean developments in philosophical naturalism. Khani felt that readers may be "dissatisfied" by the fact that Verhaegh's coverage of the reception of Quine's empiricism is restricted to responses published in the 1960s and does not extend into late 20th or 21st century contemporary philosophy. Róbert Maco gave the book a positive review in Filozofia saying that the book filled a gap in the literature on Quine's naturalism and that he felt it was well-written. However, he argued that its lack of coverage on post-Quinean naturalism or the critical responses to Quine's naturalism throughout his lifetime were limitations.
