= The Roots of Reference =

1974 book by Willard Van Orman Quine

- Author: Willard Van Orman Quine
- Language: English
- Subject: Epistemology
- Published: 1974
- Publication place: United States
- Media type: Print

The Roots of Reference is a 1974 book by the philosopher Willard Van Orman Quine, in which the author expands on his earlier concepts about the inscrutability of reference and examines problems with traditional empiricism, arguing for a naturalized epistemology based on holism.

== Background ==
Quine's draft was initially developed in 1970 as an expansion of ideas presented in Word and Object (1960) about language acquisition.

== Summary ==
The book is divided into three sections, one for each of the three Paul Carus Lectures he originally gave in 1971 at the American Philosophical Association conference. These three lectures were then revised and expanded for the book, with an introduction by Nelson Goodman.

The first section is "Perceiving and learning," and it summarizes the psychology of perception and learning. The second is "Breaking into language," and it concerns reification, which moves from rudimentary to full-fledged through the use of the relative clause with its relative pronoun and subsidiary pronouns. These pronouns then recur as the bound variables of quantifications. The third section, "Referring to objects," examines properties, classes and numbers. He concludes that it is a genetic fallacy to claim that truth cannot emerge from fallacious proofs.

Quine is interested in explaining the "psychogenesis of reference," constructing how sensory perception moves from the ability to describe concrete objects to abstract objects through a series of increasingly complex ways of referring to things. Following sensory reception of input from the physical world, someone acquiring language must learn to form "observation sentences, talk of bodies, compound sentences, quantifiers, numbers until the imagined person has a scheme not much less sophisticated than our own." According to author Gary Kemp, Quine "refines the claims and tasks of epistemology so as to make good on the basic claim that all knowledge derives from experience." Because it was created for the Carus Lectures, Quine states his ontological position in a "delightfully relaxed, good-humored style."
