= Holophrastic indeterminacy =

Holophrastic indeterminacy, or indeterminacy of sentence translation, is one of two kinds of indeterminacy of translation to appear in the writings of philosopher W. V. O. Quine. According to Quine, "there is more than one correct method of translating sentences where the two translations differ not merely in the meanings attributed to the sub-sentential parts of speech but also in the net import of the whole sentence". It is holophrastic indeterminacy that underlies Quine's argument against synonymy, the basis of his objections to Rudolf Carnap's analytic/synthetic distinction. Another kind of indeterminacy introduced by Quine is the "inscrutability of reference", which refers to parts of a sentence or individual words.

== Indeterminacy of translation ==
Quine's work on indeterminacy of translation, stemming from the basic forms of indeterminacy, is widely discussed in modern analytic philosophy:

W. V. O. Quine's contention that translation is indeterminate has been among the most widely discussed and controversial theses in modern analytical philosophy. It is a standard-bearer for one of the late twentieth century's most characteristic philosophical preoccupations: the skepticism about semantic notions which is also developed in Kripke's interpretation of Wittgenstein on rules... and which many have read into Putnam's 'model-theoretic' assault on realism...[Cross references to chapters 15 and 17 omitted]

— Crispin Wright, The indeterminacy of translation

Quine's approach to translation, radical translation, takes the perspective of trying to establish the meaning of sentences in a foreign language by observing and questioning native speakers of that language. It is a hypothetical version of what could be an empirical investigation. By an armchair analysis of such an adventure, Quine argues that it is impossible to construct a unique translation that can be defended as better than all others. The reason is predicated upon an argued unavoidable introduction of the two indeterminacies above. According to Hilary Putnam, it is “what may well be the most fascinating and the most discussed philosophical argument since Kant’s Transcendental Deduction of the Categories”.

== Naturalized epistemology ==
Holophrastic indeterminacy is important to the understanding of Quine's naturalized epistemology. As Quine states his thesis:

"If the English sentences of a theory have their meaning only together as a body, then we can justify their translation into Arunta only together as a body...Any translations of the English sentences into Arunta sentences will be as correct as any other, so long as the net empirical implications of the theory as a whole are preserved in translation. But it is to be expected that many different ways of translating the component sentences, essentially different individually, would deliver the same empirical implications for the theory as a whole; deviations in the translation of one component sentence could be compensated for in the translation of another component sentence. Insofar, there can be no ground for saying which of two glaringly unlike translations of individual sentences is right."

— Willard V. O. Quine, Epistemology naturalized, p. 80

Quine's naturalized epistemology in brief is the view that instead of traditional attempts to connect how our beliefs relate to evidence, epistemology should focus upon how experience leads to beliefs: the causal connections between our sensory evidence and our beliefs about the world.

== See also ==
- Analytic–synthetic distinction
- Duhem–Quine thesis
- Meta-ontology
- Naturalized epistemology
- Two Dogmas of Empiricism
