= Working from Within =

Working from Within may refer to:

- Working from Within (Urrieta book), 2009 Chicano studies book by Luis Urrieta
- Working from Within: The Nature and Development of Quine's Naturalism, 2018 philosophy book by Sander Verhaegh
