= Analytic apriori =

Analytic apriori may refer to:

- A priori and a posteriori
- Analytic–synthetic distinction
- Analytic truth
