= Dagfinn Føllesdal =

Norwegian philosopher (1932–2026)

- Born: Dagfinn Kåre Føllesdal; 22 June 1932; Askim, Norway
- Died: 1 March 2026 (aged 93)

Education
- Education: University of Oslo; Harvard University
- Doctoral advisor: Willard Van Orman Quine

Philosophical work
- Era: Contemporary philosophy
- Region: Western philosophy
- School: Analytic philosophy (early); Continental philosophy: phenomenology/hermeneutics (late)
- Institutions: Harvard University; Stanford University
- Notable students: Hubert Dreyfus
- Main interests: Philosophy of language
- Notable ideas: Bridging analytic philosophy and phenomenology

Dagfinn Kåre Føllesdal (22 June 1932 – 1 March 2026) was a Norwegian-born American philosopher. He was the Clarence Irving Lewis Professor of Philosophy Emeritus at Stanford University and professor emeritus at the University of Oslo.

== Life and career ==
Føllesdal was born in Askim, Norway. After earning his bachelor's and master's degrees at the University of Oslo, he attended Harvard University and earned his Ph.D. in 1961 under Willard Van Orman Quine. He taught at Harvard University from 1961 to 1964, and began teaching at Stanford University in 1968.

In March 2009, Føllesdal was appointed Commander of the Royal Norwegian Order of St. Olav by King Harald V of Norway, thanks to his work in philosophy, ethics, and bridging the divide between Anglo-American analytic philosophy and European continental philosophy.

He was a member of the Norwegian Academy for Language and Literature, the Norwegian Academy of Science and Letters, the Royal Swedish Academy of Sciences, and the American Academy of Arts and Sciences.

Føllesdal resided at Tanum. He was a practicing Roman Catholic. He regularly participated in the sport of orienteering. Føllesdal died on 1 March 2026, at the age of 93.

== Philosophical work ==
Føllesdal wrote extensively on topics relating to the philosophy of language, phenomenology, existentialism, and hermeneutics. He was a pupil of Quine and was among the leading experts on the indeterminacy of translation.

== Bibliography ==
- Referential Opacity and Modal logic. Oslo: Universitetsforlaget, 1966
- "Quine on Modality." Synthese (December 1968), 19(1–2):147–157.
- "Husserl's Notion of Noema." Journal of Philosophy (October 1969), 66(20):680–687.
- "Indeterminacy of Translation and Under-Determination of the Theory of Nature." Dialectica (1973), 27:289–301.
- "Essentialism and Reference." In Lewis Hahn, ed., The Philosophy of W. V. Quine, pp. 97–115. La Salle: Open Court, 1986.
- "Indeterminacy and Mental States." In Perspectives on Quine. Oxford & Cambridge, Massachusetts: Blackwell, 1990.
- "In What Sense Is Language Public?" In Paolo Leonardi, ed., On Quine: New Essays. New York & Cambridge: Cambridge University Press, 1995.
- "Absorbed Coping, Husserl and Heidegger." In Mark A. Wrathall and Jeff Malpas, eds., Heidegger, Authenticity, and Modernity: Essays in Honor of Hubert L. Dreyfus, Volume 1, pp. 251–257. Cambridge, Massachusetts: MIT Press, 2000.
