= Radical translation =

Philosophical thought experiment

Radical translation is a thought experiment in Word and Object, a major philosophical work from American philosopher Willard Van Orman Quine. It is used as an introduction to his theory of the indeterminacy of translation, and specifically to prove the point of inscrutability of reference. Quine paints a setting where a linguist discovers a native linguistic community whose linguistic system is completely unrelated to any language familiar to the linguist. It's called "radical translation" because the language is radically (completely) unknown. Quine then describes the steps taken by the linguist while attempting to fully translate this unfamiliar language based on the only data available: the events happening around the linguist combined with the verbal and non-verbal behaviour of natives.

== Direct translation ==
As a first step, the linguist will use direct translation on occasion sentences. Hearing a lot of utterances of the one-word-sentence 'Gavagai' whenever the linguist sees rabbits, he suspects the one-word-sentence 'Rabbit' to be the correct translation and starts a process of questioning and pointing until he is reasonably certain that the native has the verbal disposition to assent to 'Gavagai' if seeing the stimulus, a rabbit. This stimulus is the affirmative stimulus meaning of 'Gavagai', and the linguist can conclude this is a correct translation.

=== Collateral information ===
The translation of occasion sentences may be complicated through collateral information. A native, with full expertise of the local surroundings, may already assent to 'Gavagai' when not even seeing a rabbit, but is sufficiently satisfied to assent when spotting a specific rabbit-fly that only flies around rabbits. The linguist on the other hand has no such expertise, and will wonder why the hypothesis seems off. Collateral information can also create a difference of stimulus meaning between members of the same language community. To solve this issue, the linguist will determine intrasubjective stimulus synonymy, enabling the pairing of non-observational occasion sentences such as 'Bachelor' and 'Unmarried man'. While they may differ in stimulus meaning between various speakers, they are stimulus synonymous for the entire language community.

=== Stimulus analyticity ===
It is also possible for the linguist to determine stimulus analytic sentences, to which the native will assent given any (or no) stimulus. Social analytic sentences are sentences that are stimulus analytic for the entire language community.

== Words and grammar ==
So far the linguist has taken the first steps in the creation of a translation manual. However, the linguist has no idea if the term 'gavagai' is actually synonymous to the term 'rabbit', as it is just as plausible to translate it as 'one second rabbit stage', 'undetached rabbit part', 'the spatial whole of all rabbits', or 'rabbithood'. To question these differences, the linguist now has to translate words and logical particles.

Starting off with the easiest task, to translate logical connectives, the linguist formulates questions where by pairing logical connectives with occasion sentences and going through several rounds of writing down the assent or dissent to these questions from the natives to establish a translation. Any further translation of logical particles is however impossible, as translation of categorical statements (for example) relies on the translation of words, which in turn relies on the translation of categorical statements.

=== Inscrutability of reference ===
As it appears impossible to determine a unique correct translation of 'gavagai' caused by the limits of translation, the linguist can take any of the mentioned possibilities and have it correspond to the stimulus meaning through adaption of the logical connectives. This implies there is no matter of fact to which the word refers. An example is to take the sentence 'Gavagai xyz gavagai', of which the linguist assumes it translates to 'This rabbit is the same as this rabbit', and to which the native assents. Now, when 'gavagai' is taken as 'undetached rabbit part' and 'xyz' as 'is part of the same animal as', the sentence 'This undetached rabbit part is part of the same animal as this undetached rabbit part', to which the native would also assent. Both sentences have the same stimulus meaning and truth condition. It therefore is impossible to derive the (object of) reference of the term 'gavagai' from the verbal disposition of the native.

== Analytical hypotheses ==
So far the linguist has been able to (1) Translate observational sentences (2) Translate truth functions (3) Recognize stimulus analytic sentences (4) Recognize intrasubjective stimulus synonymous sentences. To go beyond the limits of translation by stimulus meaning, the linguist uses analytical hypotheses by equating parts of native sentences to parts of sentences in the linguist's own language. Using this, the linguist can now form new sentences and can create a complete translation manual by trial and error through the use of these sentences and adaption of the currently held analytical hypotheses where needed.

== Indeterminacy of translation ==
The whole of analytical hypotheses cannot be evaluated as true or false, as they are predictions that can only be judged within their own system. As a result, all translation is fundamentally undetermined (and not just underdetermined). This indeterminacy is not meaningless, as it is possible to construct two separate translation manuals that are equally correct yet incompatible with each other due to having opposing truth values. A good translation is possible, but an objectively right translation of exact terms is impossible.

== See also ==
- Indeterminacy of translation
- Word and Object
- W. V. O. Quine
