= Cognitive synonymy =

Synonyms indistinguishable in meaning

Cognitive synonymy is a type of synonymy in which synonyms are so similar in meaning that they cannot be differentiated either denotatively or connotatively, that is, not even by mental associations, connotations, emotive responses, and poetic value. It is a stricter (more precise) technical definition of synonymy, specifically for theoretical (e.g., linguistic and philosophical) purposes. In usage employing this definition, synonyms with greater differences are often called near-synonyms rather than synonyms (compare also plesionyms).

== Overview ==
If a word is cognitively synonymous with another word, they refer to the same thing independently of context. Thus, a word is cognitively synonymous with another word if and only if all instances of both words express the same exact thing, and the referents are necessarily identical, which means that the words' interchangeability is not context-sensitive.

Willard Van Orman Quine used the concept of cognitive synonymy extensively in his famous 1951 paper "Two Dogmas of Empiricism", where two words were cognitively synonymous if they were interchangeable in every possible instance.

For example,

- All bachelors are unmarried men.
- All unmarried men are not married.

Quine notes that if one is referring to the word itself, this doesn't apply, as in,

- Bachelor has fewer than ten letters.

As compared to the substitution which is obviously false,

- "Unmarried men" has less than ten letters.

== See also ==
- A priori
- Analytic–synthetic distinction
- Empiricism
- Mental association
- Quotation
- Synonym ring
