= Ontological commitment =

Object(s) postulated to exist by a given language

In formal semantics, an ontological commitment of a language is one or more objects postulated to exist by that language. The 'existence' referred to need not be 'real', but exist only in a universe of discourse. As an example, legal systems use vocabulary referring to 'legal persons' that are collective entities that have rights. One says the legal doctrine has an ontological commitment to non-singular individuals.

In information systems and artificial intelligence, where an ontology refers to a specific vocabulary and a set of explicit assumptions about the meaning and usage of these words, an ontological commitment is an agreement to use the shared vocabulary in a coherent and consistent manner within a specific context.

In philosophy, a "theory is ontologically committed to an object only if that object occurs in all the ontologies of that theory."

== Background ==
The sentence “Napoleon is one of my ancestors” apparently commits us only to the existence of two individuals (i.e., Napoleon and the speaker) and a line of ancestry between them. The fact that no other people or objects are mentioned seems to limit the “commitment” of the sentence. However, it is well known that sentences of this kind cannot be interpreted in first-order logic, where individual variables stand for individual things. Instead, they must be represented in some second-order form. In ordinary language, such second-order forms use either grammatical plurals or terms such as “set of” or “group of”.

For example, the sentence involving Napoleon can be rewritten as “any group of people that includes me and the parents of each person in the group must also include Napoleon,” which is easily interpreted as a statement in second-order logic (one would naturally start by assigning a name, such as G, to the group of people under consideration). Formally, collective noun forms such as “a group of people” are represented by second-order variables, or by first-order variables standing for sets (which are well-defined objects in mathematics and logic). Since these variables do not stand for individual objects, it seems we are “ontologically committed” to entities other than individuals — sets, classes, and so on. As Willard Van Orman Quine puts it,

the general adoption of class variables of quantification ushers in a theory whose laws were not in general expressible in the antecedent levels of logic. The price paid for this increased power is ontological: objects of a special and abstract kind, viz. classes, are now presupposed. Formally it is precisely in allowing quantification over class variables α, β, etc., that we assume a range of values for these variables to refer to. To be assumed as an entity is to be assumed as a value of a variable. (Methods of Logic, 1950, p. 228)

Another statement about individuals that appears “ontologically innocent” is the well-known Geach–Kaplan sentence: Some critics admire only one another.

== Quine's criterion ==
Willard Van Orman Quine provided an early and influential formulation of ontological commitment:

If one affirms a statement using a name or other singular term, or an initial phrase of 'existential quantification', like 'There are some so-and-sos', then one must either (1) admit that one is committed to the existence of things answering to the singular term or satisfying the descriptions, or (2) provide a 'paraphrase' of the statement that eschews singular terms and quantification over so-and sos. Quine's criterion can be seen as a logical development of the methods of Bertrand Russell and G.E. Moore, who assumed that one must accept the existence of entities corresponding to the singular terms used in statements one accepts, unless and until one finds systematic methods of paraphrase that eliminate these terms.

— Michael J. Loux & Dean W. Zimmerman, The Oxford Handbook of Metaphysics, 2003, p. 4

The purpose of Quine's strategy is to determine just how the ontological commitment of a theory is to be found. Quine argued that the only ontologically committing expressions are variables bound by a first-order existential quantifier, and natural language expressions which were formalized using variables bound by first-order existential quantifiers.

Attempts have been made to argue that predicates are also ontologically committing, and thus that subject-predicate sentences bear additional ontological commitment to abstract objects such as universals, sets, or classes. It has been suggested that the use of meaningful names in nonexistence statements such as "Pegasus does not exist" brings with it an ontological commitment to empty names like Pegasus, a quandary referred to as Plato's beard and escaped by using quantifiers.

This discussion has a connection to the Carnap–Quine argument over analytic and synthetic objects. Although Quine refers to 'ontological commitment' in this connection, in his rejection of the analytic/synthetic distinction he does not rely upon the formal translation of any particular theory along the lines he has suggested. Instead, Quine argues by using examples that although there are tautological statements in a formal theory, like "all squares are rectangles", a formal theory necessarily contains references to objects that are not tautological, but have external connections. That is, there is an ontological commitment to such external objects. In addition, the terms used to interpret the application of the theory are not simply descriptions of sensory input, but are statements in a context. That is, inversely, there is an ontological commitment of these observational objects to the formal theory. As Ryan puts it: "Rather than being divided between contingent synthetic claims and indubitable analytic propositions, our beliefs constitute a continuous range from a periphery of sense-reports to interior concepts that are comparatively theory-laden and general." Thus we end up with Quine's 'flat' ontology that does not see a distinction between analytic and synthetic objects.

Quine further made a distinction between the ontological commitments of a theory (what the theory says exists) and the ideological commitments of a theory (those concepts, logical or non-logical, that are expressible within the theory).

=== Ontological parsimony ===
Whatever process one uses to determine the ontological commitments of a theory, that does not prescribe what ontological commitments one should have. Quine regarded this as a matter of epistemology, which theory one should accept. "Appeal is made to [concerns of] explanatory power, parsimony, conservatism, precision, and so on".

Ontological parsimony can be defined in various ways, and often is equated to versions of Occam's razor, a "rule of thumb, which obliges us to favor theories or hypotheses that make the fewest unwarranted, or ad hoc, assumptions about the data from which they are derived." Glock regards 'ontological parsimony' as one of the 'five main points' of Quine's conception of ontology.

Following Quine, Baker states that a theory, T, is ontologically committed to items F if and only if T entails that F′s exist. If two theories, T_{1} and T_{2}, have the same ontological commitments except that T_{2} is ontologically committed to F′s while T_{1} is not, then T_{1} is more parsimonious than T_{2}. More generally, a sufficient condition for T_{1} being more parsimonious than T_{2} is for the ontological commitments of T_{1} to be a proper subset of those of T_{2}.

These ideas lead to the following particular formulation of Occam's razor: 'Other things being equal, if T_{1} is more ontologically parsimonious than T_{2} then it is rational to prefer T_{1} to T_{2}.' While a common formulation stipulates only that entities should not be multiplied beyond necessity, this version by contrast, states that entities should not be multiplied other things being equal, and this is compatible with parsimony being a comparatively weak theoretical virtue.

== Recent controversies ==
The standard approach to ontological commitment has been that, once a theory has been regimented and/or "paraphrased" into an agreed "canonical" version, which may indeed be in formal logical notation rather than the original language of the theory, ontological commitments can be read off straightforwardly from the presence of certain ontologically committing expressions (e.g. bound variables of existential quantification). Although there is substantial debate about which expressions are ontologically committing, parties to that debate generally agree that the expressions they prefer are reliable bearers of ontological commitment, imparting ontological commitment to all regimented sentences in which they occur. This assumption has been challenged.

Inwagen has taken issue with Quine's methodology, claiming that this process did not lead to a unique set of fundamental objects, but to several possible sets, and one never could be certain that all the possible sets had been found. He also took issue with Quine's notion of a theory, which he felt was tantamount to suggesting a 'theory' was just a collection of sentences. Inwagen suggested that Quine's approach provided useful tools for discovering what entities were ontological commitments, but that he had not been successful. His attempts are comparable to an "attempt to reach the moon by climbing ever higher trees..."

It has been suggested that the ontological commitments of a theory cannot be discerned by analysis of the syntax of sentences, looking for ontologically committing expressions, because the true ontological commitments of a sentence (or theory) are restricted to the entities needed to serve as truthmakers for that sentence, and the syntax of even a regimented or formalized sentence is not a reliable guide to what entities are needed to make it true. However, this view has been attacked by Jonathan Schaffer, who has argued that truthmaking is not an adequate test for ontological commitment: at best, the search for the truthmakers of our theory will tell us what is "fundamental", but not what our theory is ontologically committed to, and hence will not serve as a good way of deciding what exists.

It also has been argued that the syntax of sentences is not a reliable guide to their ontological commitments because English has no form of words which reliably functions to make an existence-claim in every context in which it is used. For example, Jody Azzouni suggests that "There is" does not make any kind of genuine existence-claim when it is used in a sentence such as "There are mice that talk". Since the meaning of the existential quantifier in formal notation is usually explained in terms of its equivalence to English expressions such as "there is" and "there exist", and since these English expressions are not reliably ontologically committing, it comes to seem that we cannot be sure of our theory's ontological commitments even after it has been regimented into a canonical formulation. This argument has been attacked by Howard Peacock, who suggests that Azzouni's strategy conflates two different kinds of ontological commitment – one which is intended as a measure of what a theory explicitly claims to exist, and one which is intended as a measure of what is required for the theory to be true; what the ontological costs of the theory are. If ontological commitment is thought of as a matter of the ontological costs of a theory, then it is possible that a sentence may be ontologically committed to an entity even though competent speakers of the language do not recognize the sentence as asserting the existence of that entity. Ontological commitment is not a matter of what commitments one explicitly recognizes, but rather a matter of what commitments are actually incurred.

== See also ==
- Conceptualization (information science)
- Holophrastic indeterminacy
- Indeterminacy of translation
