= Word and Object =

1960 book by Willard Van Orman Quine

- Cover of the first edition
- Author: Willard Van Orman Quine
- Language: English
- Subjects: Epistemology, language
- Publisher: MIT Press
- Publication date: 1960
- Publication place: United States
- Media type: Print (Hardcover and Paperback)
- Pages: 294
- ISBN: 0-262-67001-1

Word and Object, philosopher Willard Van Orman Quine's most famous work, expands on ideas in From a Logical Point of View (1953) and reformulates earlier arguments like his attack on the analytic–synthetic distinction from "Two Dogmas of Empiricism". It introduces the thought experiment of radical translation and the related concept of indeterminacy of translation.

== Synopsis ==
Quine emphasizes his naturalism, the doctrine that philosophy should be pursued as part of natural science. He argues in favor of naturalizing epistemology, physicalism as against phenomenalism and mind-body dualism, and extensionality as against intensionality. He also develops a behavioristic conception of sentence-meaning, theorizes about language learning, speculates on the ontogenesis of reference, explains various forms of ambiguity and vagueness, and recommends measures for regimenting language so as to eliminate ambiguity and vagueness as well as to make a theory's logic and ontic commitments perspicuous ("to be is to be the value of a bound variable"). He argues, moreover, against quantified modal logic and the essentialism it presupposes, argues for Platonic realism in mathematics, rejects instrumentalism in favor of scientific realism, develops a view of philosophical analysis as explication, argues against analyticity and for holism, against countenancing propositions, and tries to show that the meanings of theoretical sentences are indeterminate and that the reference of terms is inscrutable.

== Behaviorism ==
Central to Quine's philosophy is his linguistic behaviorism. Quine has remarked that one may or may not choose to be a behaviorist in psychology, but one has no choice but to be a behaviorist in linguistics.

This influence can be seen in Word and Object. In chapter 2 a linguist has to translate a native's unknown language into English. What is so specifically behavioristic there is that the linguist has nothing to go on but verbal behavior from the native and the visible environment the native interacts with. The same view is displayed in chapter 3 where Quine describes how a baby learns its first words. In this chapter Quine also mentions B.F. Skinner, a well known behaviorist, as one of his influences. The opposite view to Quine's and Skinner's in philosophy of language is represented by Noam Chomsky's linguistic nativism.

== Translation and meaning ==
In the second chapter of Word and Object, Quine investigates the concept of meaning. He shows to what extent his own, empirical, notion of meaning can give an account for our intuitive concept of meaning: 'what a sentence shares with its translation'. Quine also introduces his famous principle of indeterminacy of translation, with the help of the thought experiment of radical translation, i.e. translation of a hitherto unknown language (called Jungle by Quine) into English. The point of this thought experiment is to show that a behavioristic account of meaning does not allow for the determination of the right manual for translating one language into another, as there is no such single right translation manual.

A linguist desiring to translate Jungle has to set up his translation manual based only on the events happening around him/her, the stimulations, combined with the verbal and non-verbal behaviour of Jungle natives. The linguist can thus only use empirical information, therefore, radical translation will tell us which part of our language can be accounted for by stimulus conditions. In the experiment, Quine assumes that functional Jungle equivalents of 'Yes' and 'No' are relatively easy to be found. This allows the linguist to actively query the utterances of the natives, by repeating words (s)he has heard the native utter, and to subsequently record the native's reaction of assent or dissent.

In determining the translation of the Jungle sentence 'Gavagai' (whose English equivalent would be 'Look, a rabbit'), the linguist first has to determine which stimulation prompt the native to assent, and which prompt him to dissent to the linguist uttering 'Gavagai'. For example, if the linguist sees a rabbit, and the native says 'Gavagai', the linguist may think that 'Gavagai' means 'Rabbit'. (S)he will then try the sentence 'Gavagai' in different situations caused by the stimulation of a rabbit, to see whether the native assents or dissents to the utterance. The native's reaction is elicited by the linguist's question and the prompting stimulation together. It is the stimulation that prompts the assent or dissent, not the object in the world, because an object in the world can be replaced by a replica, but then the stimulation stays the same. 'The class of all the stimulations [..] that would prompt his assent' is the affirmative stimulus meaning of a certain sentence for a given speaker. Negative stimulus meaning is defined likewise, with assent and dissent interchanged. Quine calls these affirmative and negative stimulus meaning combined the stimulus meaning of the sentence. However, since we want to account for the fact that a speaker can change the meaning of a concept, we add the modulus to the definition of stimulus meaning: the time frame in which the stimulations take place. Once the stimulus meaning has been found, the linguist can then compare it to the stimulus meanings of sentences in English. The English sentence with (near-) identical stimulus meaning to 'Gavagai' functions as a translation of 'Gavagai'.

After Quine has set out the concept of stimulus meaning, he continues by comparing it with our intuitive notion of meaning. For this, he distinguished two kinds of sentences: occasion sentences and standing sentences. Occasion sentences are the sentences that are only affirmed or dissented after an appropriate stimulation, e.g. 'Look, a rabbit walks by!' On the other hand, there are standing sentences, which do not rely on stimulation for assent or dissent; they can be prompted by stimulation, but they don't have to be, e.g. 'Rabbits are mammals'. Thus, the stimulus meaning is less useful to approximate the intuitive meaning of standing sentences. However, the difference between occasion and standing sentences is only a gradual difference. This difference depends on the modulus because 'an occasion sentence modulo n seconds can be a standing sentence modulo n – 1'.

Since stimulus meaning cannot really account for the intuitive concept of meaning for standing sentences, the question remain whether it can account for the intuitive concept of meaning for observation sentences. Quine approaches this question by investigating whether, for occasion sentences, the intuitive notion of synonymy (sameness of meaning) is equivalent to the notion of stimulus synonymy (sameness of stimulus meaning). For this question, he uses the notion of observationality. A special subclass of occasion sentences are the observations sentences. Their stimulus meaning is least influenced by collateral information, extra information that is hidden for the linguist, and does not vary over the population. Therefore, observation sentences belong to the sentences that are directly translatable by the linguist. However, it is exactly this point of collateral information that poses problems for equating the intuitive notion of synonymy with the notion of stimulus synonymy. For even sentences that are supposedly highly observational, like 'Gavagai!', can be affected by collateral information. Quine uses the example of a rabbit-fly: assume that there is a fly that is unknown to the linguist, that only occurs in the presence of rabbits. Seeing such a rabbit-fly in the grass would thus make the native assent to the sentence 'Gavagai', because the native can be sure that there is a rabbit nearby. However, the rabbit-fly is not part of the stimulus meaning of 'Rabbit' for the linguist. Thus, even for the most observational occasion sentences, it is not possible to equate the intuitive notion of synonymy with stimulus synonymy. From this, Quine concludes that we cannot make sense of our intuitive notions of meaning. As Becker formulates it:

From Quine's perspective, the conclusion to be drawn from our failure to reconstruct intuitive semantics is not that the attempt was misconceived but that our ordinary notions about meaning cannot be made intelligible. More particularly, intuitive semantics is committed to a distinction—between semantic information, information about meanings, and factual (or collateral) information, information not about meanings—which we cannot make sense of even in the case of sentences like 'Rabbit', let alone for sentences in general.

=== Indeterminacy of translation ===
Having taken the first steps in translating sentences, the linguist still has no idea if the term 'gavagai' is actually synonymous to the term 'rabbit', as it is just as plausible to translate it as 'one second rabbit stage', 'undetached rabbit part', 'the spatial whole of all rabbits', or 'rabbithood'. Thus, the identical stimulus meaning of two sentences 'Gavagai' and 'Rabbit' does not mean that the terms 'gavagai' and 'rabbit' are synonymous (have the same meaning). In fact, we cannot even be sure that they are coextensive terms, because 'terms and reference are local to our conceptual scheme', and cannot be accounted for by stimulus meaning. It appears therefore impossible to determine a unique correct translation of the term 'gavagai', since the linguist can take any of the mentioned possibilities and have it correspond to the stimulus meaning through adaptation of logical connectives. This implies there is no matter of fact to which the word refers. Quine calls this the inscrutability of reference.

This inscrutability leads to difficulties in translating sentences, especially with sentences that have no direct connection to stimuli. For example, the tautological Jungle sentence 'Gavagai xyz gavagai' could be translated (in accordance with stimulus meaning) as 'This rabbit is the same as this rabbit'. However, when 'gavagai' is taken as 'undetached rabbit part' and 'xyz' as 'is part of the same animal as', the English translation could also run 'This undetached rabbit part is part of the same animal as this undetached rabbit part'. The Jungle sentence and its two English translations all have the same stimulus meaning and truth conditions, even though the two translations are clearly different. Quine concludes that the linguist can set up his translation manual in different ways, that all fit the native's speech behaviour yet are mutually incompatible. This is called holophrastic indeterminacy. There is no one correct translation of Jungle: translation is indeterminate.

=== Analytical hypotheses ===
Quine sums up the first steps of the radical translation:

(1) Observation sentences can be translated. There is uncertainty, but the situation is the normal inductive one. (2) Truth functions can be translated. (3) Stimulus-analytic sentences can be recognized. So can the sentences of the opposite type, the 'stimulus-contradictory' sentences, which command irreversible dissent. (4) Questions of intrasubjective stimulus synonymy of native occasion sentences even of non-observational kind can be settled if raised, but the sentences cannot be translated.

To go beyond these boundaries of translation by stimulus meaning, the linguist uses analytical hypotheses, in which he uses the steps (1)–(4) to equate parts of the native sentences to English words or phrases. Using the analytical hypotheses the linguist can form new sentences and create a translation manual.

== Reference ==
In Chapter 2 of Word and Object, Quine shows that the total apparatus of grammatical and semantic devices in a language is not objectively translatable into foreign languages. Therefore, in Chapter 3, he proposes to investigate a language's devices relative to each other. For this, he first describes a child's process of acquiring reference, by showing the order in which children learn grammatical devices. In Chapter 4 he then turns away from language acquisition, to investigate the vagaries of reference in a particular language (English). In Chapter 5, Quine proposes a system for regimentation, which should help us understand how reference in language works and should clarify our conceptual scheme. He calls this system the canonical notation; it is a system with which we can investigate the grammatical and semantic devices of English by paraphrase.

=== Acquiring reference ===
In order to learn a language, a child has to learn how the language expresses reference grammatically. Quine presents a behavioral theory in which the child acquires language through a process of conditioning and ostension. This process consists of four phases. In the first phase the child starts babbling. This behavior gets rewarded or not, dependent on the situation in which it occurs. Terms are learned by a process of reinforcement and extinction. In this phase, the child is not aware yet of objects, it just reacts to stimulations. This is a form of operant conditioning. In the second phase, the child acquires general terms, and demonstrative singular terms (this, that) and singular descriptions, sentences that name (or purport to name) only one object. In this phase the child also learns terms that do not have reference, like 'unicorn'. Furthermore, the child learns divided reference of general terms (that general terms refer to more than one object), and with that it has access to a conceptual scheme that includes 'enduring and recurring objects'. With this, the child has acquired the important distinction between singular and general terms. This distinction entails that a singular term 'purports to refer to one object' while a general term does not purports to refer to an object.

As Quine points out: 'The basis combination in which general and singular terms find their contrasting roles is that of predication.' Predication combines general terms with singular terms, in a sentence that is true or false just as the general term ('F') is true or false of the object to which the singular term ('a') refers. Predication is thus logically represented as 'Fa'. In the third phase, the child learns composite general terms, which are formed by joining two general terms. In the fourth phase, the child learns how to talk about new objects. The child can now apply relative terms to singular or general terms. A relative term is a term that is true of two (or more) objects in relation to each other, like 'bigger than'. The child can now make use of terms that refer to objects that cannot be seen, for example 'smaller than that speck' to refer to a neutrino. This phase thus gives a new dimension to the child's conceptual scheme.

=== Vagaries of reference and referential transparency ===
In Chapter 4 of Word and Object, Quine looks at the indeterminacies of reference that are inherent to the (English) language system. A term is vague if the boundaries of its reference are not clear. For a singular term this means that the boundaries of the object it refers to are not clear; e.g., 'mountain': for two neighboring mountains, it is not clear where the first mountain stops and the second one begins. General terms can be vague in this same way, but also in another way: namely, that there are some objects of which it is not clear whether or not they should be included among the referents of the term. For example, the term 'blue' is vague insofar as it is not clear whether some objects are blue or green. A second vagary of reference is ambiguity. Ambiguity differs from vagueness in that for a vague term the (boundaries of) its reference are uncertain, whereas ambiguous terms do refer to clearly delineated sets of objects; however, there are objects of which they are clearly true and clearly false simultaneously. For example, the term 'light' is clearly true of a dark feather (vis-á-vis weight), but at the same time clearly false of it (vis-á-vis visual brightness).

Quine also introduces the term 'referential transparency'. Quine wants to make explicit the ambiguities in language, and to show different interpretations of sentences, therefore, he has to know to what the terms in a sentence refer. A term is used in purely referential position if its only purpose is to specify its object so that the rest of the sentence can say something about it. If a term is used in purely referential position, it is subject to the substitutivity of identity: the term can be substituted by a coextensive term (a term true of the same objects) without changing the truth-value of the sentence. In the sentence, 'Amsterdam rhymes with Peter Pan' you cannot substitute 'Amsterdam' with 'the capital of the Netherlands'. A construction—a way in which a singular term or a sentence is included in another singular term or sentence—is either referentially transparent, or referentially opaque; a construction is referentially transparent if it is the case that when the included term or sentence is purely referential, it is also purely referential in the containing term or sentence. (Referential opaqueness is not to be taken as a problem to be corrected, however—Quine's goal here is to make clear which positions in a sentence are referentially transparent, not to make them all transparent.)

=== Canonical notation ===
In Chapter 5 of Word and Object Quine proposes a system of regimentation: the paraphrasing of sentences into a 'canonical notation', that we can use to understand how reference works in a language. Since we use language for science, the reductions that we make in the complexity of the structure of sentences will also simplify the conceptual schema of science. In the canonical notation, a sentence S is paraphrased as S'. S' is a paraphrase of S that should clarify its reference, which means that it often resolves ambiguities, and is therefore by definition not synonymous with S. However, S' should express the intended meaning of the speaker. Therefore, it should always be the original speaker who does the paraphrasing. The canonical notation consists of: atomic sentences (sentences that do not have sentences as a part) that have a general term in the predicate position, with one or more variables: 'Fa' or 'Fab,' etc. Non-atomic sentences are built from atomic sentences by using truth functions, quantifiers, and some other devices, like the four variable-binding operators. Quine drops tense, and instead uses the present as temporally neutral. We can express time with the use of 'a at t', where x is a spatiotemporal object. In his canonical notation, Quine has eliminated all singular terms other than variables. This greatly simplifies his logical theory, in the sense that there is economy in the roots of the theory: there is a very limited number of elements. In some situations, however, short paraphrases are very useful, for example in mathematic deductions. For these cases, Quine introduces definitions: we can define singular terms relative to the canonical notation. In that way, we can still use singular terms, without having to include them in our theory.

== Semantic ascent ==
In the last section of Word and Object, Quine asks the question why, in a book titled Word and Object, we have talked more about words than about objects. He comes to the conclusion that this has to do with the distinction Rudolf Carnap makes between a material mode of speech and a formal one. In the material mode we talk about objects themselves and usually this is unproblematic. However, when two people with completely different ideas of whether or not there are such entities as miles, are discussing miles as the objects themselves this discussion will be fruitless. It is in these instances that we see what Quine calls semantic ascent, the shift from the material mode of language to the formal one. In the formal mode of language we are at a different level. Rather than talking about miles as objects we are talking about what this word 'mile' even means, what it refers to and if it even refers at all. In the formal mode, people with different conceptual schemes might be able to have a reasonable discussion because they are talking about something their conceptual schemes have in common: language.

Quine differs from Carnap in applicability of semantic ascent. Carnap believes that talking in a formal mode is something that can only be done to some effect in philosophy. Quine, however, believes that semantic ascent is used in science as well. He argues that Einstein's theory of relativity wasn't just accepted by the scientific community because of what it had to say about 'time, light, headlong bodies and the perturbations of Mercury' in the material mode, but also because of its simplicity compared to other theories in the formal mode. The formal mode allows for a more distant approach to certain problems; however, we are not able to reach a vantage point outside of our conceptual scheme, to Quine 'there is no such cosmic exile'.

== See also ==
- American philosophy
- Indeterminacy of translation
- Neurath's boat – a philosophical analogy popularized by Word and Object
- Radical translation
