= Working from Within (Urrieta book) =

- Author: Luis Urrieta
- Language: English
- Subject: Chicana/o studies
- Publisher: University of Arizona Press
- Publication date: 2009
- Publication place: United States
- Pages: 176
- ISBN: 978-0-8165-2611-6

Working from Within: Chicana and Chicano Activist Educators in Whitestream Schools is a 2009 book on chicana/o studies by Luis Urrieta. It explores the role of chicana and chicano activist educators in changing educational practices and in helping to shape the identities of Mexican-American students.
