= Inscrutability of reference =

Philosophical thesis by Willard Van Orman Quine

The inscrutability or indeterminacy of reference (also referential inscrutability or ontological relativity) is a thesis by 20th century analytic philosopher Willard Van Orman Quine in his book Word and Object.

The main claim of this theory is that any given sentence can be changed into a variety of other sentences where the parts of the sentence will change in what they reference, but they will nonetheless maintain the meaning of the sentence as a whole.

The referential relation is inscrutable, because it is subject to the background language and ontological commitments of the speaker.

== Overview ==
The inscrutability of reference is one of two parts to Quine's thesis about the indeterminacy of translation. It concerns itself with single words, rather than propositions, which Quine made an effort to distinguish. In Quine's view, proxy functions are needed to translate a sentence from one language to another. These proxy functions map the objects and predicates to equally relevant objects and predicates. The changes made to translating the objects and predicates end up cancelling out, which renders the original sentence's meaning the same.

Quine asserts that if one tries to determine what the referential object of a certain word is, our answer will always be relative to our own background language. As Quine sees it, this idea extends to scientific and philosophical questions, not just linguistics. For example, if we are proposed a philosophical theory, we can never definitely characterize the ontological commitments of it. The most we can do is adapt this theory to one's current background philosophy, that is philosophical theories we have previously accepted. Because of this theory, Quine was often regarded as a relativist, or even a scientific skeptic. He insisted that he belongs in neither of these categories. Some authors see in the inscrutability of reference an underdetermination of relativism.

== Illustration by the use of gavagai ==
Quine used the word gavagai to illustrate referential inscrutability. The gavagai thought experiment tells about a linguist who wants to know the meaning of gavagai when uttered by a speaker of a yet-unknown language upon seeing a rabbit. At first glance, it seems that gavagai simply translates with rabbit. Quine points out that the background language and its referring devices might fool the linguist, because he is misled in a sense that he always makes direct comparisons between the foreign language and his own. However, when shouting gavagai and pointing at a rabbit, the natives could instead mean something like undetached rabbit-parts or rabbit-tropes and it would not make any observable difference. The behavioural data the linguist could collect from the native speaker would be the same in every case. Hence, the reference between the term gavagai and its referring object is language- or framework-dependent, and therefore inscrutable. Quine regards this discovery as trivial, because it is already a widely accepted fact that all the different things one word might refer to can be switched out, because of their proxy functions.

The point Quine means to make is that there is no true translation. It is impossible to discern, by any method, the correct translation and referential relation of gavagai; there is not even a correct answer to this question. To make sense of the word gavagai either way, the linguist has to assume that the speaker does not refer to complicated terms like rabbits-tropes. Thus, gavagai meaning rabbit is not really a translation, but merely a common sense interpretation.

This occurs in every language, not just in the hypothetical. This holds also for languages which are quite similar, like German and Dutch, and even for speakers of the same language. One cannot say with certainty what exactly one's conversational partner refers to when that person is talking about a rabbit. One commonly uses the homophonic rule in those cases: if an individual says rabbit, it's natural to assume the individual uses it in the same way we do. But, based on the hypothetical, there are multiple possibilities which can be indistinguishable from one another. Quine asserts that this also applies to our internal language. We ourselves do not know what it is we are referring to in using the word rabbit, that is because there is, in Quine's word, "no fact of the matter" at all. Using different possible referential objects in the same translation, however, can cause logical fallacies within the translation hypothesis, so it should be avoided.

== Anti-realist interpretation ==
Hilary Putnam uses Quine's thesis about the inscrutability of reference to challenge the traditional Realist's view that there is a mind-independent world to which our propositional attitudes refer (e.g. when we talk about or think of something, these things exist not in our minds, but in said mind-independent world). This traditional view implies a correspondence theory of truth and might simply be called Realism about Being. While Michael Dummett already tried to show that the correspondence theory fails to obtain in some particular cases, Hilary Putnam is far more radical, for he claims that this theory fails in every case it is tried to be applied. On Putnam's account, the idea that we refer with our sentences and statements to a mind-independent, nonlinguistic world is an illusion. Further he claims that the problem to deal with is a language philosophical one and uses Quine's inscrutability of reference theory to clarify his point of view. He suggests that, because the referential objects of a language are always inscrutable, the Realist's idea of a mind-independent world is fallacious, because it presupposes distinct referential relations from language to objects in the mind-independent world.

== Application in the sorites paradox ==
The inscrutability of reference is also used in the sorites paradox. The classic example for the sorites paradox mentions a heap of wheat grains from which grains are taken away one by one, continuing until only a single grain is left. Removing the grains one at a time raises the question of how long the heap remains a heap. For example, when there are only two grains, is it still a heap? When one talks about a heap, one obviously lacks such a precise definition of that word. The referential object of heap is inscrutable, in the sense that there is no such thing and it is not even necessary for the use of the term heap.

== See also ==
- Indeterminacy of translation
- Metonymy
- Opaque context
