= Indeterminacy of translation =

Philosophical argument posed by W. V. Quine (1960)

The indeterminacy of translation is a thesis propounded by 20th-century American analytic philosopher W. V. Quine. The classic statement of this thesis can be found in his 1960 book Word and Object, which gathered together and refined much of Quine's previous work on subjects other than formal logic and set theory. The indeterminacy of translation is also discussed at length in his Ontological Relativity. Crispin Wright suggests that this "has been among the most widely discussed and controversial theses in modern analytical philosophy". This view is endorsed by Hilary Putnam, who states that it is "the most fascinating and the most discussed philosophical argument since Kant's Transcendental Deduction of the Categories".

Three aspects of indeterminacy arise, of which two relate to indeterminacy of translation. The three indeterminacies are (i) inscrutability of reference, and (ii) holophrastic indeterminacy, and (iii) the underdetermination of scientific theory. The last of these, not discussed here, refers to Quine's assessment that evidence alone does not dictate the choice of a scientific theory, as different theories – observationally equivalent – may be able to explain the same facts. The first refers to indeterminacy in interpreting individual words or sub-sentences. The second refers to indeterminacy in entire sentences or more extensive portions of discourse.

== Indeterminacy of reference ==
Indeterminacy of reference refers to the interpretation of words or phrases in isolation, and Quine's thesis is that no unique interpretation is possible, because a 'radical interpreter' has no way of telling which of many possible meanings the speaker has in mind. Quine uses the example of the word "gavagai" uttered by a native speaker of the unknown language Arunta (Note: Not to be confused with the real Arrernte language) upon seeing a rabbit. A speaker of English could do what seems natural and translate this as "Lo, a rabbit." But other translations would be compatible with all the evidence he has: "Lo, food"; "Let's go hunting"; "There will be a storm tonight" (these natives may be superstitious); "Lo, a momentary rabbit-stage"; "Lo, an undetached rabbit-part." Some of these might become less likely – that is, become more unwieldy hypotheses – in the light of subsequent observation. Other translations can be ruled out only by querying the natives: An affirmative answer to "Is this the same gavagai as that earlier one?" rules out some possible translations. But these questions can only be asked once the linguist has mastered much of the natives' grammar and abstract vocabulary; that in turn can only be done on the basis of hypotheses derived from simpler, observation-connected bits of language; and those sentences, on their own, admit of multiple interpretations.

The situation is made worse when more abstract words are used, not directly attached to public observation:

Thus, translating some native utterance as, say, "Pelicans are our half-brothers" is a much more contextual affair. It involves utilizing what Quine calls analytical hypothesis (i.e. hypotheses that go beyond all possible behavioral data.) ...His [Quine's] claim is not that successful translation is impossible, but that it is multiply possible. The philosophical moral of indeterminacy of translation is that propositions, thought of as objectively valid translation relations between sentences, are simply non-existent...

— Roger F. Gibson, Quine, p. 258

These observations about the need for context brings up the next topic, holophrastic indeterminacy.

== Holophrastic indeterminacy ==
The second kind of indeterminacy, which Quine sometimes refers to as holophrastic indeterminacy, is another matter. Here the claim is that there is more than one correct method of translating sentences where the two translations differ not merely in the meanings attributed to the sub-sentential parts of speech but also in the net import of the whole sentence. This claim involves the whole language, so there are going to be no examples, perhaps except of an exceedingly artificial kind.

— Peter Hylton, Willard van Orman Quine; Stanford Encyclopedia of Philosophy

It is confusing that Quine's choice of meaning for 'holophrastic', contrasting it with sub-sentential phrases, appears to run counter to its accepted meaning in linguistics, "expressing a complex of ideas in a single word or in a fixed phrase".

Quine considers the methods available to a field linguist attempting to translate a hitherto unknown language he calls Arunta. He suggests that there are always different ways one might break a sentence into words, and different ways to distribute functions among words. Any hypothesis of translation could be defended only by appeal to context, by determining what other sentences a native would utter. But the same indeterminacy appears there: any hypothesis can be defended if one adopts enough compensatory hypotheses about other parts of the language.

== General remarks ==
Indeterminacy of translation also applies to the interpretation of speakers of one's own language, and even to one's past utterances. This does not lead to skepticism about meaning – either that meaning is hidden and unknowable, or that words are meaningless. However, when combined with a (more or less behavioristic) premise that everything that can be learned about the meaning of a speaker's utterances can be learned from the speaker's behavior, the indeterminacy of translation may be felt to suggest that there are no such entities as "meanings"; in this connection, it is highlighted (or claimed) that the notion of synonymy has no operational definition. But saying that there are no "meanings" is not to say that words are not meaningful or significant.

Quine denies an absolute standard of right and wrong in translating one language into another; rather, he adopts a pragmatic stance toward translation, that a translation can be consistent with the behavioral evidence. And while Quine does admit the existence of standards for good and bad translations, such standards are peripheral to his philosophical concern with the act of translation, hinging upon such pragmatic issues as speed of translation, and the lucidity and conciseness of the results. The key point is that more than one translation meets these criteria, and hence that no unique meaning can be assigned to words and sentences.

== Analytic–synthetic distinction ==
In Quine's view, the indeterminacy of translation leads to the inability to separate analytic statements whose validity lies in the usage of language from synthetic statements, those that assert facts about the world. The argument hinges on the role of synonymy in analytic statements, "A natural suggestion, deserving close examination, is that the synonymy of two linguistic forms consists simply in their interchangeability in all contexts without change of truth value". However, Quine argues, because of the indeterminacy of translation, any attempt to define 'analyticity' on a substitutional basis invariably introduces assumptions of the synthetic variety, resulting in a circular argument. Thus, this kind of substitutability does not provide an adequate explanation of synonyms.

== See also ==
- Analytic–synthetic distinction
- Duhem–Quine thesis
- Internal–external distinction
- Meaning (linguistics)
- Meta-ontology
- Naturalized epistemology
- Philosophy of language
- Radical interpretation
- Radical translation
- Two Dogmas of Empiricism
