= Willard Van Orman Quine =

American philosopher and logician (1908–2000)

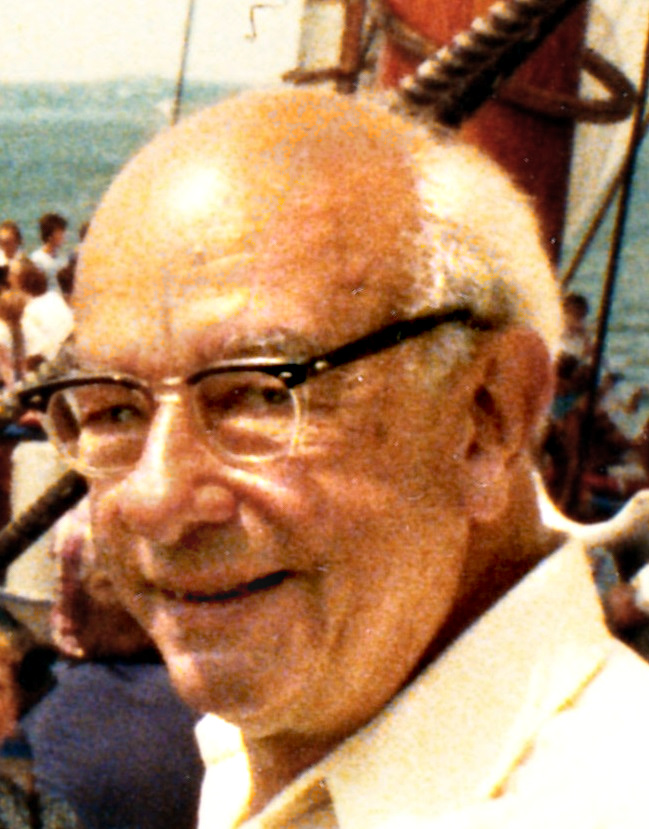
- Quine in 1980
- Born: June 25, 1908; Akron, Ohio, U.S.
- Died: December 25, 2000 (aged 92); Boston, Massachusetts, U.S.
- Spouses: Naomi Clayton (m. 1932; div. 1947) Marjorie Boynton (m. 1948; died 1998)
- Awards: Rolf Schock Prize in Logic and Philosophy (1993); Kyoto Prize (1996)

Education
- Education: Oberlin College (BA); Harvard University (PhD)
- Thesis: The Logic of Sequences: A Generalization of Principia Mathematica (1932)
- Doctoral advisor: Alfred North Whitehead
- Other advisors: Rudolf Carnap, C. I. Lewis

Philosophical work
- Era: 20th-century philosophy
- Region: Western philosophy
- School: Analytic philosophy
- Institutions: Harvard University
- Doctoral students: Dagfinn Føllesdal, Gilbert Harman, David Lewis, Robert McNaughton, John Myhill, Charles Parsons, Hao Wang
- Notable students: Sylvain Bromberger, Donald Davidson, Daniel Dennett, Burton Dreben, Hubert Dreyfus, Alvin Plantinga
- Main interests: Logic, ontology, epistemology, philosophy of language, philosophy of mind, philosophy of mathematics, philosophy of science, set theory
- Notable ideas: New Foundations, abstract objects, indeterminacy of translation, referential inscrutability, naturalized epistemology, ontological commitment, Duhem–Quine thesis, Quine–Putnam indispensability argument, confirmation holism, propositional attitude, Plato's beard, predicate functor logic, Quine–McCluskey algorithm

Willard Van Orman Quine (/kwaɪn/ KWYNE; June 25, 1908 – December 25, 2000) was an American logician and philosopher in the analytic tradition, recognized as "one of the most influential philosophers of the twentieth century". He held the Edgar Pierce Chair of Philosophy at Harvard University from 1956 to 1978.

Quine was a teacher of logic and set theory. He was famous for his position that first-order logic is the only kind worthy of the name, and developed his own system of mathematics and set theory, known as New Foundations. In the philosophy of mathematics, he and his Harvard colleague Hilary Putnam developed the Quine–Putnam indispensability argument, an argument for the reality of mathematical entities. He was the main proponent of the view that philosophy is not conceptual analysis, but continuous with science; it is the abstract branch of the empirical sciences. This led to his famous quip that "philosophy of science is philosophy enough". He led a "systematic attempt to understand science from within the resources of science itself" and developed an influential naturalized epistemology that tried to provide "an improved scientific explanation of how we have developed elaborate scientific theories on the basis of meager sensory input". He also advocated holism in science, known as the Duhem–Quine thesis.

His major writings include the papers "On What There Is" (1948), which elucidated Bertrand Russell's theory of descriptions and contains Quine's famous dictum of ontological commitment, "To be is to be the value of a variable", and "Two Dogmas of Empiricism" (1951), which attacked the traditional analytic-synthetic distinction and reductionism, undermining the then-popular logical positivism, advocating instead a form of semantic holism and ontological relativity. They also include the books The Web of Belief (1970), which advocates a kind of coherentism, and Word and Object (1960), which further developed these positions and introduced Quine's famous indeterminacy of translation thesis, advocating a behaviorist theory of meaning.

== Biography ==
Quine's parents were Cloyd Robert Quine and Harriet Ellis Van Orman. Quine grew up in Akron, Ohio, where he lived with his parents and older brother Robert Cloyd. His father was a manufacturing entrepreneur (founder of the Akron Equipment Company, which produced tire molds) and his mother was a schoolteacher and housewife. Quine became an atheist around the age of nine and remained one for the rest of his life.

=== Education ===
Quine received his B.A., summa cum laude, in mathematics from Oberlin College in 1930, and his Ph.D. in philosophy from Harvard University in 1932. His thesis supervisor was Alfred North Whitehead. He was then appointed a Harvard Junior Fellow, which excused him from having to teach for four years. During the academic year 1932–33, he travelled in Europe thanks to a Sheldon Fellowship, meeting Polish logicians (including Jan Łukasiewicz, Stanislaw Lesniewski and Alfred Tarski) and members of the Vienna Circle (including Rudolf Carnap), as well as the logical positivist A. J. Ayer. It was in Prague that Quine developed a passion for philosophy, thanks to Carnap, whom he called his "true and only maître à penser".

=== World War II ===
Quine arranged for Tarski to be invited to the September 1939 Unity of Science Congress in Cambridge, for which the Jewish Tarski sailed on the last ship to leave Danzig before Nazi Germany invaded Poland and triggered World War II. Tarski survived the war and worked another 44 years in the US. During the war, Quine lectured on logic in Brazil, in Portuguese, and served in the United States Navy in a military intelligence role, deciphering messages from German submarines, and reaching the rank of lieutenant commander. Quine could lecture in French, German, Italian, Portuguese, and Spanish as well as his native English.

=== Personal ===
He had four children by two marriages. Guitarist Robert Quine was his nephew.

Quine was politically conservative, but the bulk of his writing was in technical areas of philosophy removed from direct political issues. He did, however, write in defense of several conservative positions: for example, he wrote in defense of moral censorship; while, in his autobiography, he made some criticisms of American postwar academics.

=== Harvard ===
At Harvard, Quine helped supervise the Harvard graduate theses of, among others, David Lewis, Gilbert Harman, Dagfinn Føllesdal, Hao Wang, Hugues LeBlanc, Henry Hiz and George Myro. For the academic year 1964–1965, Quine was a fellow on the faculty in the Center for Advanced Studies at Wesleyan University. In 1980 Quine received an honorary doctorate from the Faculty of Humanities at Uppsala University, Sweden.

Quine's student Dagfinn Føllesdal noted that Quine suffered from memory loss towards his final years. The deterioration of his short-term memory was so severe that he struggled to continue following arguments. Quine also had considerable difficulty in his project to make the desired revisions to Word and Object. Before dying, Quine noted to Morton White: "I do not remember what my illness is called, Althusser or Alzheimer, but since I cannot remember it, it must be Alzheimer." He died from the illness on Christmas Day in 2000.

== Philosophy ==
Quine's Ph.D. thesis and early publications were on formal logic and set theory. Only after World War II did he, by virtue of seminal papers on ontology, epistemology and language, emerge as a major philosopher. By the 1960s, he had worked out his "naturalized epistemology" whose aim was to answer all substantive questions of knowledge and meaning using the methods and tools of the natural sciences. Quine roundly rejected the notion that there should be a "first philosophy," a theoretical standpoint somehow prior to natural science and capable of justifying it. These views are intrinsic to his naturalism.

Like the majority of analytic philosophers, who were mostly interested in systematic thinking, Quine evinced little interest in the philosophical canon: only once did he teach a course in the history of philosophy, on David Hume, in 1946.

=== Logic ===
Over the course of his career, Quine published numerous technical and expository papers on formal logic, some of which are reprinted in his Selected Logic Papers and in The Ways of Paradox. His most well-known collection of papers is From A Logical Point of View. Quine confined logic to classical bivalent first-order logic, hence to truth and falsity under any (nonempty) universe of discourse. Hence the following were not logic for Quine:

- Higher-order logic and set theory. He referred to higher-order logic as "set theory in disguise";
- Much of what Principia Mathematica included in logic was not logic for Quine.
- Formal systems involving intensional notions, especially modality. Quine was especially hostile to modal logic with quantification, a battle he largely lost when Saul Kripke's relational semantics became canonical for modal logics.

Quine wrote three undergraduate texts on formal logic:

- Elementary Logic. While teaching an introductory course in 1940, Quine discovered that extant texts for philosophy students did not do justice to quantification theory or first-order predicate logic. Quine wrote this book in 6 weeks as an ad hoc solution to his teaching needs.
- Methods of Logic. The four editions of this book resulted from a more advanced undergraduate course in logic Quine taught from the end of World War II until his 1978 retirement.
- Philosophy of Logic. A concise and witty undergraduate treatment of a number of Quinian themes, such as the prevalence of use-mention confusions, the dubiousness of quantified modal logic, and the non-logical character of higher-order logic.

Mathematical Logic is based on Quine's graduate teaching during the 1930s and 1940s. It shows that much of what Principia Mathematica took more than 1000 pages to say can be said in 250 pages. The proofs are concise, even cryptic. The last chapter, on Gödel's incompleteness theorem and Tarski's indefinability theorem, along with the article Quine (1946), became a launching point for Raymond Smullyan's later lucid exposition of these and related results.

Quine's work in logic gradually became dated in some respects. Techniques he did not teach and discuss include analytic tableaux, recursive functions, and model theory. His treatment of metalogic left something to be desired. For example, Mathematical Logic does not include any proofs of soundness and completeness. Early in his career, the notation of his writings on logic was often idiosyncratic. His later writings nearly always employed the now-dated notation of Principia Mathematica. Set against all this are the simplicity of his preferred method (as exposited in his Methods of Logic) for determining the satisfiability of quantified formulas, the richness of his philosophical and linguistic insights, and the fine prose in which he expressed them.

Most of Quine's original work in formal logic from 1960 onwards was on variants of his predicate functor logic, one of several ways that have been proposed for doing logic without quantifiers. For a comprehensive treatment of predicate functor logic and its history, see Quine (1976). For an introduction, see ch. 45 of his Methods of Logic.

Quine was very warm to the possibility that formal logic would eventually be applied outside of philosophy and mathematics. He wrote several papers on the sort of Boolean algebra employed in electrical engineering, and with Edward J. McCluskey, devised the Quine–McCluskey algorithm of reducing Boolean equations to a minimum covering sum of prime implicants.

=== Set theory ===
While his contributions to logic include elegant expositions and a number of technical results, it is in set theory that Quine was most innovative. He always maintained that mathematics required set theory and that set theory was quite distinct from logic. He flirted with Nelson Goodman's nominalism for a while but backed away when he failed to find a nominalist grounding of mathematics.

Over the course of his career, Quine proposed three axiomatic set theories.

- New Foundations (NF) creates and manipulates sets using a single axiom schema for set admissibility, namely an axiom schema of stratified comprehension, whereby all individuals satisfying a stratified formula compose a set. A stratified formula is one that type theory would allow, were the ontology to include types. However, Quine's set theory does not feature types. The metamathematics of NF are curious. NF allows many "large" sets the now-canonical ZFC set theory does not allow, even sets for which the axiom of choice does not hold. Since the axiom of choice holds for all finite sets, the failure of this axiom in NF proves that NF includes infinite sets. The consistency of NF relative to other formal systems adequate for mathematics is an open question, albeit that a number of candidate proofs are current in the NF community suggesting that NF is equiconsistent with Zermelo set theory without Choice. A modification of NF, NFU, due to Ronald Jensen and admitting urelements (entities that can be members of sets but that lack elements), turns out to be consistent relative to Peano arithmetic, thus vindicating the intuition behind NF. NF and NFU are the only Quinean set theories with a following. For a derivation of foundational mathematics in NF, see Rosser (1952);
- The set theory of Mathematical Logic is NF augmented by the proper classes of von Neumann–Bernays–Gödel set theory, except axiomatized in a much simpler way;
- The set theory of Set Theory and Its Logic does away with stratification and is almost entirely derived from a single axiom schema. Quine derived the foundations of mathematics once again. This book includes the definitive exposition of Quine's theory of virtual sets and relations, and surveyed axiomatic set theory as it stood circa 1960.

All three set theories admit a universal class, but since they are free of any hierarchy of types, they have no need for a distinct universal class at each type level.

Quine's set theory and its background logic were driven by a desire to minimize posits; each innovation is pushed as far as it can be pushed before further innovations are introduced. For Quine, there is but one connective, the Sheffer stroke, and one quantifier, the universal quantifier. All polyadic predicates can be reduced to one dyadic predicate, interpretable as set membership. His rules of proof were limited to modus ponens and substitution. He preferred conjunction to either disjunction or the conditional, because conjunction has the least semantic ambiguity. He was delighted to discover early in his career that all of first order logic and set theory could be grounded in a mere two primitive notions: abstraction and inclusion. For an elegant introduction to the parsimony of Quine's approach to logic, see his "New Foundations for Mathematical Logic", ch. 5 in his From a Logical Point of View.

=== Metaphysics ===
Quine has had numerous influences on contemporary metaphysics. He coined the term "abstract object".

In his famous essay "On What There Is", he connected each of the three main metaphysical ontological positions—realism, conceptualism, and nominalism—with one of three dominant schools in the modern philosophy of mathematics: logicism, intuitionism, and formalism, respectively. In the same work, he coined the term "Plato's beard" to refer to the problem of empty names:

Suppose now that two philosophers, McX and I, differ over ontology. Suppose McX maintains there is something which I maintain there is not. McX can, quite consistently with his own point of view, describe our difference of opinion by saying that I refuse to recognize certain entities ... When I try to formulate our difference of opinion, on the other hand, I seem to be in a predicament. I cannot admit that there are some things which McX countenances and I do not, for in admitting that there are such things I should be contradicting my own rejection of them ... This is the old Platonic riddle of nonbeing. Nonbeing must in some sense be, otherwise what is it that there is not? This tangled doctrine might be nicknamed Plato's beard; historically it has proved tough, frequently dulling the edge of Occam’s razor.

Quine was unsympathetic, however, to the claim that saying 'X does not exist' is a tacit acceptance of X's existence and, thus, a contradiction. Appealing to Bertrand Russell and his theory of "singular descriptions", Quine explains how Russell was able to make sense of "complex descriptive names" ('the present King of France', 'the author of Waverly', etc.) by thinking about them as merely "fragments of the whole sentences". For example, 'The author of Waverly was a poet' becomes 'some thing is such that it is the author of Waverly and was a poet, and nothing else is such that it is the author of Waverly'.

Using this sort of analysis with the word 'Pegasus' (that which Quine is wanting to assert does not exist), he turns Pegasus into a description. Turning the word 'Pegasus' into a description is to turn 'Pegasus' into a predicate, to use a term of First-order logic: i.e. a property. As such, when we say 'Pegasus', we are really saying 'the thing that is Pegasus' or 'the thing that Pegasizes'. This introduces, to use another term from logic, bound variables (ex: 'everything', 'something,' etc.) As Quine explains, bound variables, "far from purporting to be names specifically...do not purport to be names at all: they refer to entities generally, with a kind of studied ambiguity peculiar to themselves."

Putting it another way, to say 'I hate everything' is a very different statement than saying 'I hate Bertrand Russell', because the words 'Bertrand Russell' are a proper name that refer to a very specific person. Whereas the word 'everything' is a placeholder. It does not refer to a specific entity or entities. Quine is able, therefore, to make a meaningful claim about Pegasus' nonexistence for the simple reason that the placeholder (a thing) happens to be empty. It just so happens that the world does not contain a thing that is such that it is winged and it is a horse.

==== Rejection of the analytic–synthetic distinction ====
In the 1930s and 40s, discussions with Rudolf Carnap, Nelson Goodman and Alfred Tarski, among others, led Quine to doubt the tenability of the distinction between "analytic" statements—those true simply by the meanings of their words, such as "No bachelor is married"— and "synthetic" statements, those true or false by virtue of facts about the world, such as "There is a cat on the mat." This distinction was central to logical positivism. Although Quine is not normally associated with verificationism, some philosophers believe the tenet is not incompatible with his general philosophy of language, citing his Harvard colleague B. F. Skinner and his analysis of language in Verbal Behavior. But Quine believes, with all due respect to his "great friend" Skinner, that the ultimate reason is to be found in neurology and not in behavior. For him, behavioral criteria establish only the terms of the problem, the solution of which, however, lies in neurology.

Like other analytic philosophers before him, Quine accepted the definition of "analytic" as "true in virtue of meaning alone." Unlike them, however, he concluded that ultimately the definition was circular. In other words, Quine accepted that analytic statements are those that are true by definition, then argued that the notion of truth by definition was unsatisfactory.

Quine's chief objection to analyticity is with the notion of cognitive synonymy (sameness of meaning). He argues that analytical sentences are typically divided into two kinds; sentences that are clearly logically true (e.g. "no unmarried man is married") and the more dubious ones; sentences like "no bachelor is married." Previously it was thought that if you can prove that there is synonymity between "unmarried man" and "bachelor," you have proved that both sentences are logically true and therefore self evident. Quine however gives several arguments for why this is not possible, for instance that "bachelor" in some contexts means a Bachelor of Arts, not an unmarried man.

==== Confirmation holism and ontological relativity ====
Colleague Hilary Putnam called Quine's indeterminacy of translation thesis "the most fascinating and the most discussed philosophical argument since Kant's Transcendental Deduction of the Categories". The central theses underlying it are ontological relativity and the related doctrine of confirmation holism. The premise of confirmation holism is that all theories (and the propositions derived from them) are under-determined by empirical data (data, sensory-data, evidence); although some theories are not justifiable, failing to fit with the data or being unworkably complex, there are many equally justifiable alternatives. While the Greeks' assumption that (unobservable) Homeric gods exist is false and our supposition of (unobservable) electromagnetic waves is true, both are to be justified solely by their ability to explain our observations.

The gavagai thought experiment tells about a linguist, who tries to find out, what the expression gavagai means, when uttered by a speaker of a yet unknown, native language upon seeing a rabbit. At first glance, it seems that gavagai simply translates with rabbit. Now, Quine points out that the background language and its referring devices might fool the linguist here, because he is misled in a sense that he always makes direct comparisons between the foreign language and his own. However, when shouting gavagai, and pointing at a rabbit, the natives could as well refer to something like undetached rabbit-parts, or rabbit-tropes and it would not make any observable difference. The behavioural data the linguist could collect from the native speaker would be the same in every case, or to reword it, several translation hypotheses could be built on the same sensoric stimuli.

Quine concluded his "Two Dogmas of Empiricism" as follows:

As an empiricist I continue to think of the conceptual scheme of science as a tool, ultimately, for predicting future experience in the light of past experience. Physical objects are conceptually imported into the situation as convenient intermediaries not by definition in terms of experience, but simply as irreducible posits comparable, epistemologically, to the gods of Homer …. For my part I do, qua lay physicist, believe in physical objects and not in Homer's gods; and I consider it a scientific error to believe otherwise. But in point of epistemological footing, the physical objects and the gods differ only in degree and not in kind. Both sorts of entities enter our conceptions only as cultural posits.

Quine's ontological relativism (evident in the passage above) led him to agree with Pierre Duhem that for any collection of empirical evidence, there would always be many theories able to account for it, known as the Duhem–Quine thesis. However, Duhem's holism is much more restricted and limited than Quine's. For Duhem, underdetermination applies only to physics or possibly to natural science, while for Quine it applies to all of human knowledge. Thus, while it is possible to verify or falsify whole theories, it is not possible to verify or falsify individual statements. Almost any particular statement can be saved, given sufficiently radical modifications of the containing theory. For Quine, scientific thought forms a coherent web in which any part could be altered in the light of empirical evidence, and in which no empirical evidence could force the revision of a given part.

==== Existence and its contrary ====
The problem of non-referring names is an old puzzle in philosophy, which Quine captured when he wrote,

A curious thing about the ontological problem is its simplicity. It can be put into three Anglo-Saxon monosyllables: 'What is there?' It can be answered, moreover, in a word—'Everything'—and everyone will accept this answer as true.

More directly, the controversy goes:

How can we talk about Pegasus? To what does the word 'Pegasus' refer? If our answer is, 'Something', then we seem to believe in mystical entities; if our answer is, 'nothing', then we seem to talk about nothing and what sense can be made of this? Certainly when we said that Pegasus was a mythological winged horse we make sense, and moreover we speak the truth! If we speak the truth, this must be truth about something. So we cannot be speaking of nothing.

Quine resists the temptation to say that non-referring terms are meaningless for reasons made clear above. Instead he tells us that we must first determine whether our terms refer or not before we know the proper way to understand them. However, Czesław Lejewski criticizes this belief for reducing the matter to empirical discovery when it seems we should have a formal distinction between referring and non-referring terms or elements of our domain. Lejewski writes further:

This state of affairs does not seem to be very satisfactory. The idea that some of our rules of inference should depend on empirical information, which may not be forthcoming, is so foreign to the character of logical inquiry that a thorough re-examination of the two inferences [existential generalization and universal instantiation] may prove worth our while.

Lejewski then goes on to offer a description of free logic, which he claims accommodates an answer to the problem.

Lejewski also points out that free logic additionally can handle the problem of the empty set for statements like $\forall x\,Fx \rightarrow \exists x\,Fx$. Quine had considered the problem of the empty set unrealistic, which left Lejewski unsatisfied.

==== Ontological commitment ====
The notion of ontological commitment plays a central role in Quine's contributions to ontology. A theory is ontologically committed to an entity if that entity must exist in order for the theory to be true. Quine proposed that the best way to determine this is by translating the theory in question into first-order predicate logic. Of special interest in this translation are the logical constants known as existential quantifiers ('∃'), whose meaning corresponds to expressions like "there exists..." or "for some...". They are used to bind the variables in the expression following the quantifier. The ontological commitments of the theory then correspond to the variables bound by existential quantifiers. For example, the sentence "There are electrons" could be translated as "∃x Electron(x)", in which the bound variable x ranges over electrons, resulting in an ontological commitment to electrons. This approach is summed up by Quine's famous dictum that "[t]o be is to be the value of a variable". Quine applied this method to various traditional disputes in ontology. For example, he reasoned from the sentence "There are prime numbers between 1000 and 1010" to an ontological commitment to the existence of numbers, i.e. realism about numbers. This method by itself is not sufficient for ontology since it depends on a theory in order to result in ontological commitments. Quine proposed that we should base our ontology on our best scientific theory. Various followers of Quine's method chose to apply it to different fields, for example to "everyday conceptions expressed in natural language".

==== Indispensability argument for mathematical realism ====
In philosophy of mathematics, he and his Harvard colleague Hilary Putnam developed the Quine–Putnam indispensability thesis, an argument for the reality of mathematical entities.

The form of the argument is as follows.

1. One must have ontological commitments to all entities that are indispensable to the best scientific theories, and to those entities only (commonly referred to as "all and only").
2. Mathematical entities are indispensable to the best scientific theories. Therefore,
3. One must have ontological commitments to mathematical entities.

The justification for the first premise is the most controversial. Both Putnam and Quine invoke naturalism to justify the exclusion of all non-scientific entities, and hence to defend the "only" part of "all and only". The assertion that "all" entities postulated in scientific theories, including numbers, should be accepted as real is justified by confirmation holism. Since theories are not confirmed in a piecemeal fashion, but as a whole, there is no justification for excluding any of the entities referred to in well-confirmed theories. This puts the nominalist who wishes to exclude the existence of sets and non-Euclidean geometry, but to include the existence of quarks and other undetectable entities of physics, for example, in a difficult position.

=== Epistemology ===
Just as he challenged the dominant analytic–synthetic distinction, Quine also took aim at traditional normative epistemology. According to Quine, traditional epistemology tried to justify the sciences, but this effort (as exemplified by Rudolf Carnap) failed, and so we should replace traditional epistemology with an empirical study of what sensory inputs produce what theoretical outputs:

Epistemology, or something like it, simply falls into place as a chapter of psychology and hence of natural science. It studies a natural phenomenon, viz., a physical human subject. This human subject is accorded a certain experimentally controlled input—certain patterns of irradiation in assorted frequencies, for instance—and in the fullness of time the subject delivers as output a description of the three-dimensional external world and its history. The relation between the meager input and the torrential output is a relation that we are prompted to study for somewhat the same reasons that always prompted epistemology: namely, in order to see how evidence relates to theory, and in what ways one's theory of nature transcends any available evidence... But a conspicuous difference between old epistemology and the epistemological enterprise in this new psychological setting is that we can now make free use of empirical psychology.

As previously reported, in other occasions Quine used the term "neurology" instead of "empirical psychology".

Quine's proposal is controversial among contemporary philosophers and has several critics, with Jaegwon Kim the most prominent among them.

== In popular culture ==
- A computer program whose output is its own source code is called a "quine" after Quine. This usage was introduced by Douglas Hofstadter in his 1979 book, Gödel, Escher, Bach: An Eternal Golden Braid.
- Quine was selected for inclusion in the Committee for Skeptical Inquiry's "Pantheon of Skeptics", which celebrates contributors to the cause of scientific skepticism.

== Bibliography ==
=== Selected books ===
- 1934 A System of Logistic. Harvard Univ. Press.
- 1951 (1940). Mathematical Logic. Harvard Univ. Press. ISBN 0-674-55451-5.
- 1980 (1941). Elementary Logic. Harvard Univ. Press. ISBN 0-674-24451-6.
- 1982 (1950). Methods of Logic. Harvard Univ. Press.
- 1980 (1953). From a Logical Point of View. Harvard Univ. Press. ISBN 0-674-32351-3. Contains "Two dogmas of Empiricism."
- 1960 Word and Object. MIT Press; ISBN 0-262-67001-1. The closest thing Quine wrote to a philosophical treatise. Ch. 2 sets out the indeterminacy of translation thesis.
- 1969 (1963). Set Theory and Its Logic. Harvard Univ. Press.
- 1966. Selected Logic Papers. New York: Random House.
- 1976 (1966). The Ways of Paradox. Harvard Univ. Press.
- 1969 Ontological Relativity and Other Essays. Columbia Univ. Press. ISBN 0-231-08357-2. Contains chapters on ontological relativity, naturalized epistemology, and natural kinds.
- 1970 (2nd ed., 1978). With J. S. Ullian. The Web of Belief. New York: Random House.
- 1986 (1970). The Philosophy of Logic. Harvard Univ. Press.
- 1974 (1971). The Roots of Reference. Open Court Publishing Company ISBN 0-8126-9101-6 (developed from Quine's Carus Lectures).
- 1981. Theories and Things. Harvard Univ. Press.
- 1985. The Time of My Life: An Autobiography. Cambridge, The MIT Press. ISBN 0-262-17003-5.
- 1987. Quiddities: An Intermittently Philosophical Dictionary. Harvard Univ. Press. ISBN 0-14-012522-1. A work of essays, many subtly humorous, for lay readers, very revealing of the breadth of his interests.
- 1992 (1990). Pursuit of Truth. Harvard Univ. Press. A short, lively synthesis of his thought for advanced students and general readers not fooled by its simplicity. ISBN 0-674-73951-5.
- 1995. From Stimulus to Science. Harvard Univ. Press. ISBN 0-674-32635-0.
- 2004. Quintessence: Basic Readings from the Philosophy of W V Quine. Harvard Univ. Press.
- 2008. Confessions of a Confirmed Extensionalist and Other Essays. Harvard Univ. Press.

=== Important articles ===
- 1946, "Concatenation as a basis for arithmetic". Reprinted in his Selected Logic Papers. Harvard Univ. Press.
- 1948, "On What There Is", Review of Metaphysics 2(5) (JSTOR). Reprinted in his 1953 From a Logical Point of View. Harvard University Press.
- 1951, "Two Dogmas of Empiricism", The Philosophical Review 60: 20–43. Reprinted in his 1953 From a Logical Point of View. Harvard University Press.
- 1956, "Quantifiers and Propositional Attitudes", Journal of Philosophy 53. Reprinted in his 1976 Ways of Paradox. Harvard Univ. Press: 185–196.
- 1969, "Epistemology Naturalized" in Ontological Relativity and Other Essays. New York: Columbia University Press: 69–90.
- "Truth by Convention", first published in 1936. Reprinted in the book, Readings in Philosophical Analysis, edited by Herbert Feigl and Wilfrid Sellars, pp. 250–273, Appleton-Century-Crofts, 1949.

== Filmography ==
- Bryan Magee (host), Men of Ideas: "The Ideas of Quine", BBC, 1978.
- Rudolf Fara (host), In Conversation: W. V. Quine (7 videocassettes), Philosophy International, Centre for Philosophy of the Natural and Social Sciences, London School of Economics, 1994.

== See also ==
- Definitions of philosophy
- List of American philosophers
