= Analytic–synthetic distinction =

Semantic distinction in philosophy

The analytic–synthetic distinction is a semantic distinction used primarily in philosophy to distinguish between propositions (in particular, statements that are affirmative subject–predicate judgments) that are of two types: analytic propositions and synthetic propositions. Analytic propositions are true or not true solely by virtue of their meaning, whereas synthetic propositions' truth, if any, derives from how their meaning relates to the world.

The distinction between analytic and synthetic method in various areas of knowledge, in particular in mathematics, dates to antiquity. However, the distinction between analytic and synthetic propositions was first proposed by Immanuel Kant. It was then revised considerably over time, and different philosophers have used the terms in very different ways. Furthermore, some philosophers (starting with Willard Van Orman Quine) have questioned whether there is even a clear distinction to be made between propositions which are analytically true and propositions which are synthetically true. Debates regarding the nature and usefulness of the distinction continue to this day in contemporary philosophy of language.

== Kant ==
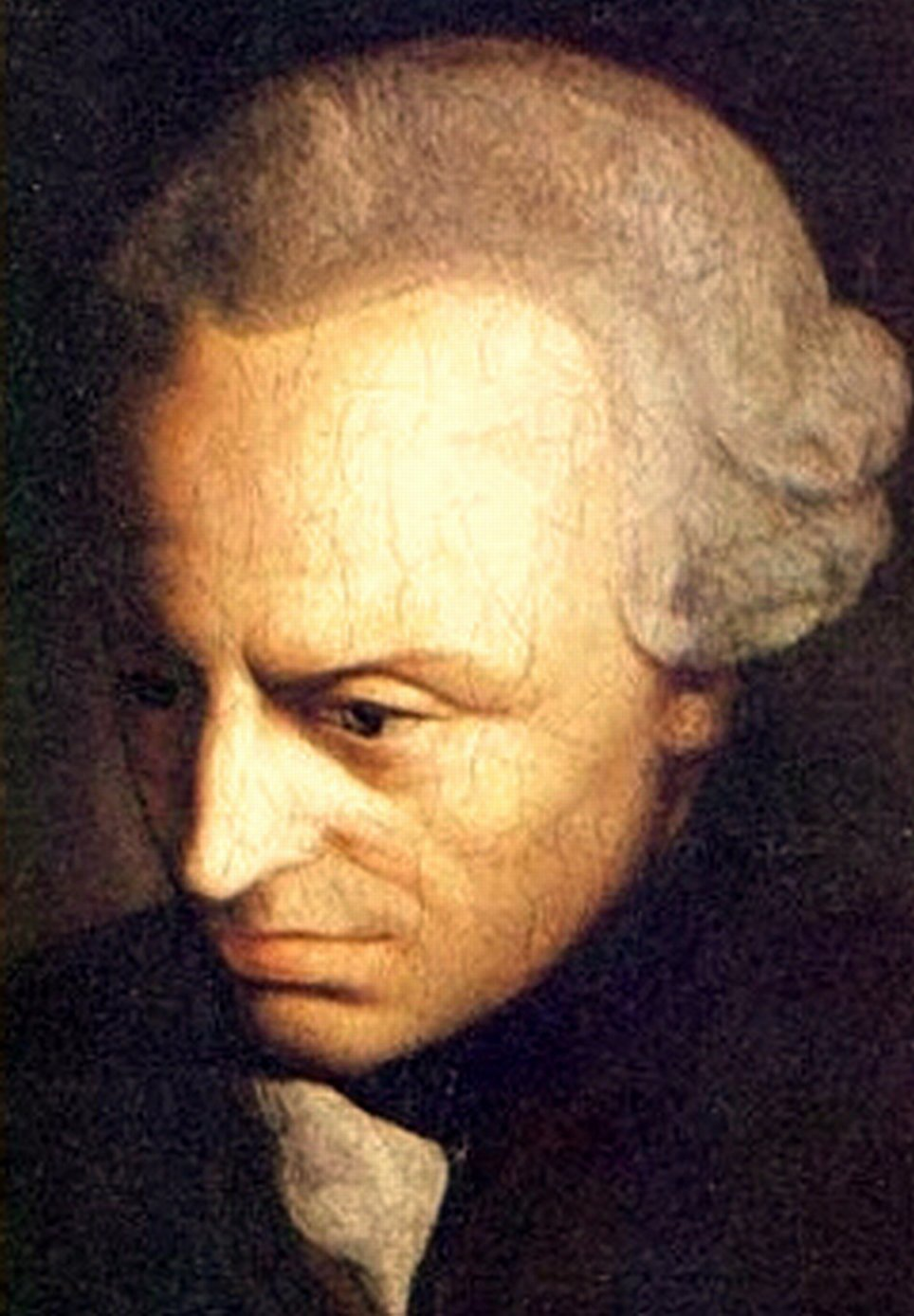
Immanuel Kant

=== Conceptual containment ===
The philosopher Immanuel Kant uses the terms "analytic" and "synthetic" to divide propositions into two types. Kant introduces the analytic–synthetic distinction in the Introduction to his Critique of Pure Reason (1781/1998, A6–7/B10–11). There, he restricts his attention to statements that are affirmative subject–predicate judgments and defines "analytic proposition" and "synthetic proposition" as follows:

- analytic proposition: a proposition whose predicate concept is contained in its subject concept
- synthetic proposition: a proposition whose predicate concept is not contained in its subject concept but related

Examples of analytic propositions, on Kant's definition, include:

- "All bachelors are unmarried."
- "All triangles have three sides."

Kant's own example is:

- "All bodies are extended": that is, they occupy space. (A7/B11)

Each of these statements is an affirmative subject–predicate judgment, and, in each, the predicate concept is contained within the subject concept. The concept "bachelor" contains the concept "unmarried"; the concept "unmarried" is part of the definition of the concept "bachelor". Likewise, for "triangle" and "has three sides", and so on.

Examples of synthetic propositions, on Kant's definition, include:

- "All bachelors are alone."
- "All creatures with hearts have kidneys."

Kant's own example is:

- "All bodies are heavy": that is, they experience a gravitational force. (A7/B11)

As with the previous examples classified as analytic propositions, each of these new statements is an affirmative subject–predicate judgment. However, in none of these cases does the subject concept contain the predicate concept. The concept "bachelor" does not contain the concept "alone"; "alone" is not a part of the definition of "bachelor". The same is true for "creatures with hearts" and "have kidneys"; even if every creature with a heart also has kidneys, the concept "creature with a heart" does not contain the concept "has kidneys". So the philosophical issue is: What kind of statement is "Language is used to transmit meaning"?

=== Kant's version and the a priori–a posteriori distinction ===
In the Introduction to the Critique of Pure Reason, Kant contrasts his distinction between analytic and synthetic propositions with another distinction, the distinction between a priori and a posteriori propositions. He defines these terms as follows:

- a priori proposition: a proposition whose justification does not rely upon experience. Moreover, the proposition can be validated by experience, but is not grounded in experience. Therefore, it is logically necessary.
- a posteriori proposition: a proposition whose justification does rely upon experience. The proposition is validated by, and grounded in, experience. Therefore, it is logically contingent.

Examples of a priori propositions include:

- "All bachelors are unmarried."
- "7 + 5 = 12."

The justification of these propositions does not depend upon experience: one need not consult experience to determine whether all bachelors are unmarried, nor whether 7 + 5 = 12. (Of course, as Kant would grant, experience is required to understand the concepts "bachelor", "unmarried", "7", "+" and so forth. However, the a priori–a posteriori distinction as employed here by Kant refers not to the origins of the concepts but to the justification of the propositions. Once we have the concepts, experience is no longer necessary.)

Examples of a posteriori propositions include:

- "All bachelors are unhappy."
- "Tables exist."

Both of these propositions are a posteriori: any justification of them would require one's experience.

The analytic–synthetic distinction and the a priori–a posteriori distinction together yield four types of propositions:

- analytic a priori
- synthetic a priori
- analytic a posteriori
- synthetic a posteriori

Kant posits the third type as obviously self-contradictory. Ruling it out, he discusses only the remaining three types as components of his epistemological framework—each, for brevity's sake, becoming, respectively, "analytic", "synthetic a priori", and "empirical" or "a posteriori" propositions. This triad accounts for all propositions possible. Examples of analytic and examples of a posteriori statements have already been given, for synthetic a priori propositions he gives those in mathematics and physics.

=== The ease of knowing analytic propositions ===
Part of Kant's argument in the Introduction to the Critique of Pure Reason involves arguing that there is no problem figuring out how knowledge of analytic propositions is possible. To know an analytic proposition, Kant argued, one need not consult experience. Instead, one needs merely to take the subject and "extract from it, in accordance with the principle of contradiction, the required predicate" (B12). In analytic propositions, the predicate concept is contained in the subject concept. Thus, to know an analytic proposition is true, one need merely examine the concept of the subject. If one finds the predicate contained in the subject, the judgment is true.

Thus, for example, one need not consult experience to determine whether "All bachelors are unmarried" is true. One need merely examine the subject concept ("bachelors") and see if the predicate concept "unmarried" is contained in it. And in fact, it is: "unmarried" is part of the definition of "bachelor" and so is contained within it. Thus the proposition "All bachelors are unmarried" can be known to be true without consulting experience.

It follows from this, Kant argued, first: All analytic propositions are a priori; there are no a posteriori analytic propositions. It follows, second: There is no problem understanding how we can know analytic propositions; we can know them because we only need to consult our concepts in order to determine that they are true.

=== The possibility of metaphysics ===
After ruling out the possibility of analytic a posteriori propositions, and explaining how we can obtain knowledge of analytic a priori propositions, Kant also explains how we can obtain knowledge of synthetic a posteriori propositions. That leaves only the question of how knowledge of synthetic a priori propositions is possible. This question is exceedingly important, Kant maintains, because all scientific knowledge (for him Newtonian physics and mathematics) is made up of synthetic a priori propositions. If it is impossible to determine which synthetic a priori propositions are true, he argues, then metaphysics as a discipline is impossible. The remainder of the Critique of Pure Reason is devoted to examining whether and how knowledge of synthetic a priori propositions is possible.

=== Mathematics and Synthetic Apriori Propositions. ===
One example Kant gives of a possibly synthetic a priori propositions are the propositions of mathematics. The mathematical equation that 10 = 0.2x 50 is true regardless of experience thus making it a priori, but not analytic. Mathematical propositions are not analytic in that 10 does not self evidently contain 0.2x50, in the same way that the concept bachelor contains the categories of unmarried and male.

=== The Importance of Synthetic Apriori Propositions to Kant's metaphysics ===
Kant's advocacy for his metaphysics in Critique of Pure Reason can be seen as relying on the possibility of synthetic apriori claims. If synthetic apriori propositions are possible, it supposes a certain metaphysical worldview, much of the Critique of Pure reason then relies on the possibility of synthetic apriori propositions to justify a worldview. One could reduce Kant's argument into a simple form: If Kant's metaphysics is true, then synthetic apriori propositions are possible.

== Frege and the logical positivists ==
=== Frege revision of Kantian definition ===
Over a hundred years later, a group of philosophers took interest in Kant and his distinction between analytic and synthetic propositions: the logical positivists.

Part of Kant's examination of the possibility of synthetic a priori knowledge involved the examination of mathematical propositions, such as

- "7 + 5 = 12." (B15–16)
- "The shortest distance between two points is a straight line." (B16–17)

Kant maintained that mathematical propositions such as these are synthetic a priori propositions, and that we know them. That they are synthetic, he thought, is obvious: the concept "equal to 12" is not contained within the concept "7 + 5"; and the concept "straight line" is not contained within the concept "the shortest distance between two points". From this, Kant concluded that we have knowledge of synthetic a priori propositions.

Although not strictly speaking a logical positivist, Gottlob Frege's notion of analyticity influenced them greatly. It included a number of logical properties and relations beyond containment: symmetry, transitivity, antonymy, or negation and so on. He had a strong emphasis on formality, in particular formal definition, and also emphasized the idea of substitution of synonymous terms. "All bachelors are unmarried" can be expanded out with the formal definition of bachelor as "unmarried man" to form "All unmarried men are unmarried", which is recognizable as tautologous and therefore analytic from its logical form: any statement of the form "All X that are (F and G) are F". Using this particular expanded idea of analyticity, Frege concluded that Kant's examples of arithmetical truths are analytical a priori truths and not synthetic a priori truths.

Thanks to Frege's logical semantics, particularly his concept of analyticity, arithmetic truths like "7+5=12" are no longer synthetic a priori but analytical a priori truths in Carnap's extended sense of "analytic". Hence logical empiricists are not subject to Kant's criticism of Hume for throwing out mathematics along with metaphysics.

(Here "logical empiricist" is a synonym for "logical positivist".)

=== The origin of the logical positivist's distinction ===
The logical positivists agreed with Kant that we have knowledge of mathematical truths, and further that mathematical propositions are a priori. However, they did not believe that any complex metaphysics, such as the type Kant supplied, are necessary to explain our knowledge of mathematical truths. Instead, the logical positivists maintained that our knowledge of judgments like "all bachelors are unmarried" and our knowledge of mathematics (and logic) are in the basic sense the same: all proceeded from our knowledge of the meanings of terms or the conventions of language.

Since empiricism had always asserted that all knowledge is based on experience, this assertion had to include knowledge in mathematics. On the other hand, we believed that with respect to this problem the rationalists had been right in rejecting the old empiricist view that the truth of "2+2=4" is contingent on the observation of facts, a view that would lead to the unacceptable consequence that an arithmetical statement might possibly be refuted tomorrow by new experiences. Our solution, based upon Wittgenstein's conception, consisted in asserting the thesis of empiricism only for factual truth. By contrast, the truths of logic and mathematics are not in need of confirmation by observations, because they do not state anything about the world of facts, they hold for any possible combination of facts.

— Rudolf Carnap, "Autobiography": §10: Semantics, p. 64

=== Logical positivist definitions ===
Thus the logical positivists drew a new distinction, and, inheriting the terms from Kant, named it the "analytic-synthetic distinction". They provided many different definitions, such as the following:

- analytic proposition: a proposition whose truth depends solely on the meaning of its terms
- analytic proposition: a proposition that is true (or false) by definition
- analytic proposition: a proposition that is made true (or false) solely by the conventions of language

(While the logical positivists believed that the only necessarily true propositions were analytic, they did not define "analytic proposition" as "necessarily true proposition" or "proposition that is true in all possible worlds".)

Synthetic propositions were then defined as:

- synthetic proposition: a proposition that is not analytic

These definitions applied to all propositions, regardless of whether they were of subject–predicate form. Thus, under these definitions, the proposition "It is raining or it is not raining" was classified as analytic, while for Kant it was analytic by virtue of its logical form. And the proposition "7 + 5 = 12" was classified as analytic, while under Kant's definitions it was synthetic.

== Two-dimensionalism ==
Two-dimensionalism is an approach to semantics in analytic philosophy. It is a theory of how to determine the sense and reference of a word and the truth-value of a sentence. It is intended to resolve a puzzle that has plagued philosophy for some time, namely: How is it possible to discover empirically that a necessary truth is true? Two-dimensionalism provides an analysis of the semantics of words and sentences that makes sense of this possibility. The theory was first developed by Robert Stalnaker, but it has been advocated by numerous philosophers since, including David Chalmers and Berit Brogaard.

Any given sentence, for example, the words,

"Water is H_{2}O"

is taken to express two distinct propositions, often referred to as a primary intension and a secondary intension, which together compose its meaning.

The primary intension of a word or sentence is its sense, i.e., is the idea or method by which we find its referent. The primary intension of "water" might be a description, such as watery stuff. The thing picked out by the primary intension of "water" could have been otherwise. For example, on some other world where the inhabitants take "water" to mean watery stuff, but, where the chemical make-up of watery stuff is not H_{2}O, it is not the case that water is H_{2}O for that world.

The secondary intension of "water" is whatever thing "water" happens to pick out in this world, whatever that world happens to be. So if we assign "water" the primary intension watery stuff then the secondary intension of "water" is H_{2}O, since H_{2}O is watery stuff in this world. The secondary intension of "water" in our world is H_{2}O, which is H_{2}O in every world because unlike watery stuff it is impossible for H_{2}O to be other than H_{2}O. When considered according to its secondary intension, "Water is H_{2}O" is true in every world.

If two-dimensionalism is workable it solves some very important problems in the philosophy of language. Saul Kripke has argued that "Water is H_{2}O" is an example of the necessary a posteriori, since we had to discover that water was H_{2}O, but given that it is true, it cannot be false. It would be absurd to claim that something that is water is not H_{2}O, for these are known to be identical.

== Carnap's distinction ==
Rudolf Carnap was a strong proponent of the distinction between what he called "internal questions", questions entertained within a "framework" (like a mathematical theory), and "external questions", questions posed outside any framework – posed before the adoption of any framework. The "internal" questions could be of two types: logical (or analytic, or logically true) and factual (empirical, that is, matters of observation interpreted using terms from a framework). The "external" questions were also of two types: those that were confused pseudo-questions ("one disguised in the form of a theoretical question") and those that could be re-interpreted as practical, pragmatic questions about whether a framework under consideration was "more or less expedient, fruitful, conducive to the aim for which the language is intended". The adjective "synthetic" was not used by Carnap in his 1950 work Empiricism, Semantics, and Ontology. Carnap did define a "synthetic truth" in his work Meaning and Necessity: a sentence that is true, but not simply because "the semantical rules of the system suffice for establishing its truth".

The notion of a synthetic truth is of something that is true both because of what it means and because of the way the world is, whereas analytic truths are true in virtue of meaning alone. Thus, what Carnap calls internal factual statements (as opposed to internal logical statements) could be taken as being also synthetic truths because they require observations, but some external statements also could be "synthetic" statements and Carnap would be doubtful about their status. The analytic–synthetic argument therefore is not identical with the internal–external distinction.

== Quine's criticisms ==
In 1951, Willard Van Orman Quine published the essay "Two Dogmas of Empiricism" in which he argued that the analytic–synthetic distinction is untenable. The argument at bottom is that there are no "analytic" truths, but all truths involve an empirical aspect. In the first paragraph, Quine takes the distinction to be the following:

- analytic propositions – propositions grounded in meanings, independent of matters of fact.
- synthetic propositions – propositions grounded in fact.

Quine's position denying the analytic–synthetic distinction is summarized as follows:

It is obvious that truth in general depends on both language and extralinguistic fact. ... Thus one is tempted to suppose in general that the truth of a statement is somehow analyzable into a linguistic component and a factual component. Given this supposition, it next seems reasonable that in some statements the factual component should be null; and these are the analytic statements. But, for all its a priori reasonableness, a boundary between analytic and synthetic statements simply has not been drawn. That there is such a distinction to be drawn at all is an unempirical dogma of empiricists, a metaphysical article of faith.

— Willard V. O. Quine, "Two Dogmas of Empiricism", p. 64

To summarize Quine's argument, the notion of an analytic proposition requires a notion of synonymy, but establishing synonymy inevitably leads to matters of fact – synthetic propositions. Thus, there is no non-circular (and so no tenable) way to ground the notion of analytic propositions.

While Quine's rejection of the analytic–synthetic distinction is widely known, the precise argument for the rejection and its status is highly debated in contemporary philosophy. However, some (for example, Paul Boghossian) argue that Quine's rejection of the distinction is still widely accepted among philosophers, even if for poor reasons.

=== Responses ===
Paul Grice and P. F. Strawson criticized "Two Dogmas" in their 1956 article "In Defense of a Dogma". Among other things, they argue that Quine's skepticism about synonyms leads to a skepticism about meaning. If statements can have meanings, then it would make sense to ask "What does it mean?". If it makes sense to ask "What does it mean?", then synonymy can be defined as follows: Two sentences are synonymous if and only if the true answer of the question "What does it mean?" asked of one of them is the true answer to the same question asked of the other. They also draw the conclusion that discussion about correct or incorrect translations would be impossible given Quine's argument. Four years after Grice and Strawson published their paper, Quine's book Word and Object was released. In the book Quine presented his theory of indeterminacy of translation.

In Speech Acts, John Searle argues that from the difficulties encountered in trying to explicate analyticity by appeal to specific criteria, it does not follow that the notion itself is void. Considering the way that we would test any proposed list of criteria, which is by comparing their extension to the set of analytic statements, it would follow that any explication of what analyticity means presupposes that we already have at our disposal a working notion of analyticity.

In "'Two Dogmas' Revisited", Hilary Putnam argues that Quine is attacking two different notions:

It seems to me there is as gross a distinction between 'All bachelors are unmarried' and 'There is a book on this table' as between any two things in this world, or at any rate, between any two linguistic expressions in the world;

— Hilary Putnam, Philosophical Papers, p. 36

Analytic truth defined as a true statement derivable from a tautology by putting synonyms for synonyms is near Kant's account of analytic truth as a truth whose negation is a contradiction. Analytic truth defined as a truth confirmed no matter what, however, is closer to one of the traditional accounts of a priori. While the first four sections of Quine's paper concern analyticity, the last two concern a-priority. Putnam considers the argument in the two last sections as independent of the first four, and at the same time as Putnam criticizes Quine, he also emphasizes his historical importance as the first top-rank philosopher to both reject the notion of a-priority and sketch a methodology without it.

Jerrold Katz, a one-time associate of Noam Chomsky, countered the arguments of "Two Dogmas" directly by trying to define analyticity non-circularly on the syntactical features of sentences. Chomsky himself critically discussed Quine's conclusion, arguing that it is possible to identify some analytic truths (truths of meaning, not truths of facts) which are determined by specific relations holding among some innate conceptual features of the mind or brain.

In Philosophical Analysis in the Twentieth Century, Volume 1: The Dawn of Analysis, Scott Soames pointed out that Quine's circularity argument needs two of the logical positivists' central theses to be effective:

All necessary (and all a priori) truths are analytic.

Analyticity is needed to explain and legitimate necessity.

It is only when these two theses are accepted that Quine's argument holds. It is not a problem that the notion of necessity is presupposed by the notion of analyticity if necessity can be explained without analyticity. According to Soames, both theses were accepted by most philosophers when Quine published "Two Dogmas". Today, however, Soames holds both statements to be antiquated. He says: "Very few philosophers today would accept either [of these assertions], both of which now seem decidedly antique."

== In other fields ==
This distinction was imported from philosophy into theology, with Albrecht Ritschl attempting to demonstrate that Kant's epistemology was compatible with Lutheranism.

== See also ==
- A priori and a posteriori
- Abstract and concrete
- Failure to elucidate
- Form and content
- Holophrastic indeterminacy
- Paradox of analysis
- Soundness
- Trikonic

== References and further reading ==
- Rey, Georges. (2003). "The Analytic/Synthetic Distinction". The Stanford Encyclopedia of Philosophy, Edward Zalta (ed.).
- Russell, G. (2007). The analytic/synthetic distinction. Philosophy Compass, 2(5), 712-729.doi:10.1111/j.1747-9991.2007.00093.x
- Boghossian, Paul. (1996). "Analyticity Reconsidered". Nous, Vol. 30, No. 3, pp. 360–391.doi:10.2307/2216275
- Margolis, E., & Laurence, S. (2001). Boghossian on Analyticity. Analysis, 61(4), pp. 293-302. doi:10.1111/1467-8284.00308
- Baehr, Jason S. (October 18, 2006). "A Priori and A Posteriori". In J. Fieser; B. Dowden (eds.). The Internet Encyclopedia of Philosophy.
- Harman, G. (1996). Analyticity regained?. Noûs, 30(3), 392-400. doi:10.2307/2216276
- Cory Juhl; Eric Loomis (2009). Analyticity. Routledge. ISBN 978-0415773331.
- Glock, Hans-Johann; Gluer, Kathrin; Keil, Geert (2003). Fifty Years of Quine's "Two dogmas". Rodopi. ISBN 978-9042009486.
- Kant, Immanuel. (1781/1998). The Critique of Pure Reason. Trans. by P. Guyer and A.W. Wood, Cambridge University Press.
- Margolis, E., & Laurence, S. (2003). Should We Trust Our Intuitions? Deflationary Accounts of the Analytic Data. Proceedings of the Aristotelian Society, 103(3), pp. 299-323. doi:10.1111/j.0066-7372.2003.00074.x
- Soames, Scott (2009). "Chapter 14: Ontology, Analyticity and Meaning: The Quine-Carnap Dispute" (PDF). In David John Chalmers; David Manley; Ryan Wasserman (eds.). Metametaphysics: New Essays on the Foundations of Ontology. Oxford University Press. ISBN 978-0199546046.
- Frank X Ryan (2004). "Analytic: Analytic/Synthetic". In John Lachs; Robert B. Talisse (eds.). American Philosophy: An Encyclopedia. Psychology Press. pp. 36–39. ISBN 978-0203492796.
- Quine, W. V. (1951). "Two Dogmas of Empiricism". Philosophical Review, Vol.60, No.1, pp. 20–43. Reprinted in From a Logical Point of View (Cambridge, MA: Harvard University Press, 1953).
- Robert Hanna (2012). "The return of the analytic-synthetic distinction". Paradigmi.
- Sloman, Aaron (1965-10-01). "'Necessary', 'a priori' and 'analytic'". Analysis. 26 (1): 12–16. doi:10.1093/analys/26.1.12.
