= Naturalized epistemology =

Collection of philosophic views

Naturalized epistemology is a collection of philosophic views about the theory of knowledge that emphasize the role of natural scientific methods. This shared emphasis on scientific methods of studying knowledge shifts the focus of epistemology away from many traditional philosophical questions, and towards the empirical processes of knowledge acquisition. There are noteworthy distinctions within naturalized epistemology. Replacement naturalism maintains that we should abandon traditional epistemology and replace it with the methodologies of the natural sciences. The general thesis of cooperative naturalism is that traditional epistemology can benefit in its inquiry by using the knowledge we have gained from cognitive sciences. Substantive naturalism focuses on an asserted equality of facts of knowledge and natural facts.

The name for such epistemology was coined in the 20th century by W. V. O. Quine. Objections to naturalized epistemology have targeted features of the general project as well as characteristics of specific versions. Some objectors argue that natural scientific knowledge cannot be circularly grounded by the knowledge obtained through cognitive science, which is itself a natural science. This objection from circularity has been aimed specifically at strict replacement naturalism. There are similar challenges to substance naturalism that maintain that the substance naturalists' thesis that all facts of knowledge are natural facts is not only circular but fails to accommodate certain facts. Several other objectors have found fault in the inability of naturalized methods to adequately address questions about what value forms of potential knowledge have or lack.

== Forms of naturalism ==
=== Replacement naturalism ===
W. V. O. Quine's version of naturalized epistemology considers reasons for serious doubt about the fruitfulness of traditional philosophic study of scientific knowledge. These concerns are raised in light of the long attested incapacity of philosophers to find a satisfactory answer to the problems of radical scepticism and, more particularly, to David Hume's criticism of induction. But also, because of the contemporaneous attempts and failures to reduce mathematics to pure logic by those in or philosophically sympathetic to The Vienna Circle. Quine concludes that studies of scientific knowledge concerned with meaning or truth fail to achieve the Cartesian goal of certainty. The failures in the reduction of mathematics to pure logic imply that scientific knowledge can at best be defined with the aid of less certain set-theoretic notions. Even if set theory's lacking the certainty of pure logic is deemed acceptable, the usefulness of constructing an encoding of scientific knowledge as logic and set theory is undermined by the inability to construct a useful translation from logic and set-theory back to scientific knowledge. If no translation between scientific knowledge and the logical structures can be constructed that works both ways, then the properties of the purely logical and set-theoretic constructions do not usefully inform understanding of scientific knowledge.

On Quine's account, attempts to pursue the traditional project of finding the meanings and truths of science philosophically have failed on their own terms and failed to offer any advantage over the more direct methods of psychology. Quine rejects the analytic-synthetic distinction and emphasizes the holistic nature of our beliefs. Since traditional philosophic analysis of knowledge fails, those wishing to study knowledge ought to employ natural scientific methods. Scientific study of knowledge differs from philosophic study by focusing on how humans acquire knowledge rather than speculative analysis of knowledge. According to Quine, this appeal to science to ground the project of studying knowledge, which itself underlies science, should not be dismissed for its circularity since it is the best option available after ruling out traditional philosophic methods for their more serious flaws. This identification and tolerance of circularity is reflected elsewhere in Quine's works.

=== Cooperative naturalism ===
Cooperative naturalism is a version of naturalized epistemology which states that while there are evaluative questions to pursue, the empirical results from psychology concerning how individuals actually think and reason are essential and useful for making progress in these evaluative questions. This form of naturalism says that our psychological and biological limitations and abilities are relevant to the study of human knowledge. Empirical work is relevant to epistemology but only if epistemology is itself as broad as the study of human knowledge.

=== Substantive naturalism ===
Substantive naturalism is a form of naturalized epistemology that emphasizes how all epistemic facts are natural facts. Natural facts can be based on two main ideas. The first is that all natural facts include all facts that science would verify. The second is to provide a list of examples that consists of natural items. This will help in deducing what else can be included.

== Criticism ==
Quine articulates the problem of circularity inherent to naturalized epistemology when it is treated as a replacement for traditional epistemology. If the goal of traditional epistemology is to validate or to provide the foundation for the natural sciences, then naturalized epistemology would be tasked with validating the natural sciences by means of those very sciences. That is, an empirical investigation into the criteria which are used to scientifically evaluate evidence must presuppose those very same criteria. However, Quine points out that these concerns with validation are merely a byproduct of traditional epistemology. Instead, the naturalized epistemologist should only be concerned with understanding the link between observation and science, even if that understanding makes use of the very science under investigation.

In order to understand the link between observation and science, Quine's naturalized epistemology must be able to identify and describe the process by which scientific knowledge is acquired. One form of this investigation is reliabilism, which requires that a belief be the product of some reliable method if it is to be considered knowledge. Since naturalized epistemology relies on empirical evidence, all epistemic facts which comprise this reliable method must be reducible to natural facts. That is, all facts related to the process of understanding must be expressible in terms of natural facts. If there are facts which cannot be expressed as natural facts, science would have no means of investigating them. In this vein, Roderick Chisholm argues that there are epistemic principles (or facts) which are necessary to knowledge acquisition, but may not be, themselves, natural facts. If Chisholm is correct, naturalized epistemology cannot account for these epistemic principles and, as a result, would be unable to wholly describe the process by which knowledge is obtained.

Beyond Quine's own concerns and potential discrepancies between epistemic and natural facts, Hilary Putnam argues that replacing traditional epistemology with naturalized epistemology would eliminate the normative. But without the normative, there is no "justification, rational acceptability [nor] warranted assertibility". Ultimately, there is no "true" since any method for arriving at the truth was abandoned with the normative. Notions which explain truth are intelligible only when the normative is presupposed. Moreover, for there to be "thinkers", there "must be some kind of truth"; otherwise, "our thoughts aren't really about anything [,...] there is no sense in which any thought is right or wrong". Without the normative to dictate how one should proceed or which methods should be employed, naturalized epistemology cannot determine the "right" criteria by which empirical evidence should be evaluated. But these are precisely the issues traditional epistemology has been tasked with. If naturalized epistemology cannot provide the means for addressing these issues, it cannot succeed in replacing traditional epistemology.

P. M. S. Hacker has argued that naturalized epistemology is "in effect the abandonment of epistemology in favour of a millennial neurophysiological learning theory that would explain in purely causal terms how the irritation of our surfaces by radiation and impact ultimately results in our theories of the world".

Jaegwon Kim, another critic of naturalized epistemology, further articulates the difficulty of removing the normative component. He notes that modern epistemology has been dominated by the concepts of justification and reliability. Kim argues that epistemology and knowledge are nearly eliminated in their common sense meanings without normative concepts such as these. These concepts are meant to engender the question "What conditions must a belief meet if we are justified in accepting it as true?". That is to say, what are the necessary criteria by which a particular belief can be declared as "true" (or, should it fail to meet these criteria, can we rightly infer its falsity)? This notion of truth rests solely on the conception and application of the criteria which are set forth in traditional and modern theories of epistemology.

Kim further explains how the notion of "justification" (alongside "belief" and "truth") is the defining characteristic of an epistemological study. To remove this aspect is to alter the very meaning and goal of epistemology, whereby we are no longer discussing the study and acquisition of knowledge. As Kim puts it, "If justification drops out of epistemology, knowledge itself drops out of epistemology." Justification is what makes knowledge valuable and normative; without it what can rightly be called true or false? We are left with only descriptions of the processes by which we arrive at a belief. Quine is moving epistemology into the realm of psychology, where Quine's main interest is based on the sensory input–output relationship of an individual. On Kim's view, this account cannot establish an affirmable statement that leads us to truth, since all statements without the normative are purely descriptive and so cannot amount to knowledge. The vulgar allowance of any statements as scientifically valid, but not "true", makes Quine's theory difficult to accept on any epistemic theory that requires truth as the object of knowledge.

In response, Quine insists that critics are wrong to suggest that, given his naturalized epistemology, "the normative element, so characteristic of epistemology, goes by the board. Insofar as theoretical epistemology gets naturalized into a chapter of theoretical science, so normative epistemology gets naturalized into a chapter of engineering: the technology of anticipating sensory stimulation." Thus, "[t]he normative is naturalized, not dropped." There remains debate, however, about whether Quine's view can account for the normativity of epistemology.

As a result of these objections and others like them, most contemporary philosophers agree that replacement naturalized epistemology may be too strong of a view (even Quine held more moderate views in later writings). However, these objections have helped shape rather than eliminate naturalized epistemology. One product of these objections is cooperative naturalism, which holds that empirical results are essential and useful to epistemology. That is, while traditional epistemology cannot be eliminated, neither can it succeed in its investigation of knowledge without empirical results from the natural sciences. In any case, Quinean Replacement Naturalism finds relatively few supporters.

== Bibliography ==
- Almeder, Robert (1998) Harmless Naturalism: The Limits of Science and the Nature of Philosophy, Peru, Illinois: Open Court.
- BonJour, Laurence (1994) "Against Naturalized Epistemology," Midwest Studies in Philosophy, XIX: 283–300.
- Chisholm, Roderick (1966)Theory of Knowledge, Englewood Cliffs, NJ: Prentice-Hall.
- Chisholm, Roderick (1982) The Foundations of Knowing, Minneapolis: University of Minnesota Press.
- Chisholm, Roderick (1989)Theory of Knowledge, 3rd ed., Englewood Cliffs, NJ: Prentice-Hall.
- Feldman, Richard (1999), "Methodological Naturalism in Epistemology," in The Blackwell Guide to Epistemology, edited by John Greco and Ernest Sosa, Malden, Ma: Blackwell, pp. 170–186.
- Foley, Richard (1994) "Quine and Naturalized Epistemology," Midwest Studies in Philosophy, XIX: 243–260.
- Fumerton, Richard (1994) "Skepticism and Naturalistic Epistemology," Midwest Studies in Philosophy, XIX: 321–340.
- Fumerton, Richard (1995) Metaepistemology and Skepticism, Lanham, MD: Rowman and Littlefield.
- Gibbard, Allan (1990) Wise Feelings, Apt Choices, Cambridge: Harvard University Press.
- Goldman, Alvin (1979) "What is Justified Belief?," in G. Pappas, ed., Justification and Knowledge: New Studies in Epistemology, Dordrecht, Reidel: 1-23.
- Goldman, Alvin (1992), Liaisons: Philosophy Meets the Cognitive and Social Sciences, Cambridge: MIT Press.
- Haack, Susan (1993) Evidence and Inquiry: Towards Reconstruction in Epistemology, Oxford: Blackwell.
- Harman, Gilbert (1977) Thought, Princeton: Princeton University Press.
- Kim, Jaegwon (1988) "What is Naturalized Epistemology?" Philosophical Perspectives 2 edited by James E. Tomberlin, Asascadero, CA: Ridgeview Publishing Co: 381–406.
- Kitcher, Philip (1992) "The Naturalists Return," Philosophical Review, 101: 53–114.
- Kornblith, Hilary (1994) Naturalizing Epistemology 2nd Edition, Cambridge: MIT Press.
- Kornblith, Hilary (1999) "In Defense of a Naturalized Epistemology" in The Blackwell Guide to Epistemology, edited by John Greco and Ernest Sosa, Malden, Ma: Blackwell, pp. 158–169.
- Kornblith, Hilary (1988) "How Internal Can You Get?," Synthese, 74: 313–327.
- Lehrer, Keith (1997) Self-Trust: A study of Reason, Knowledge and Autonomy, Oxford: Clarendon Press.
- Lycan, William (1988) Judgement and Justification, Cambridge: Cambridge University Press.
- Mafffie, James (1990) "Recent Work on Naturalizing Epistemology," American Philosophical Quarterly 27: 281–293.
- Pollock, John (1986) Contemporary Theories of Knowledge, Totawa, NJ: Rowman and Littlefield.
- Quine, W.V.O. (1969) Ontological Relativity and Other Essays, New York: Columbia University Press.
- Quine, W.V.O. (1990) "Norms and Aims" in The Pursuit of Truth, Cambridge: Harvard University Press.
- Steup, Matthias, An Introduction to Contemporary Epistemology, Prentice-Hall, 1996.
- Stich, Stephen and Richard Nisbett (1980), "Justification and the Psychology of Human Reasoning," Philosophy of Science 47: 188–202.
- Stich, Stephen (1990) The Fragmentation of Reason, Cambridge, MA: MIT Press.
- Strawson, Peter (1952) Introduction to Logical Theory, New York: Wiley.
- van Cleve, James (1985) "Epistemic Supervenience and the Circle of Belief" Monist 68: 90–104.
