= Charles F. Manski =

American economist

- Born: November 27, 1948 (age 77); Boston, Massachusetts, U.S.

Academic background
- Education: Massachusetts Institute of Technology; Boston Latin School
- Doctoral advisor: Franklin M. Fisher

Academic work
- Discipline: Econometrics
- Institutions: Northwestern University; University of Wisconsin-Madison; Hebrew University of Jerusalem; Carnegie-Mellon University
- Doctoral students: Francesca Molinari
- Website: Information at IDEAS / RePEc

Charles Frederick Manski (born November 27, 1948) is an American economist and university professor at Northwestern University. Manski is a noted econometrician, known for his work in rational choice theory and an innovator in the area of parameter identification. His research spans econometrics, judgment and decision, and the analysis of social policy (such as work on school choice). A specialist in prediction and decision, he is known within the economics field for landmark work on partial identification, identification of discrete choice models, and identification of social interactions. He has also performed substantial empirical research on measurement of expectations in surveys.

Manski was predicted to win the Nobel Prize in 2015 by Reuters along with two other economists. Chicago economist John A. List for his work on field experiments and English economist Richard Blundell for his work on labor markets were also listed as favorites to win a future Nobel Prize.

== Early life ==
He is the son of Holocaust survivor and Sugihara visa recipient Samuil Manski and Estelle Zonn Manski. He grew up in Dorchester and West Roxbury, both in Massachusetts, attended Boston Latin School, and spent many afternoons in the family diner. One day, while leading a Torah reading, he had an epiphany that led him away from religious studies and towards scientific skepticism:

"[I] learned something about why dogmas can be tenacious and irreconcilable. Many doctrines pose nonrefutable hypotheses. That is, they make statements about the world that are impossible to disprove. For example, it is impossible to disprove the hypothesis that the god of the Torah created the universe in six days and then rested on the seventh day. It is similarly impossible to disprove the hypothesis that the universe was created by the Flying Spaghetti Monster."

== Personal life ==
Manski is married to Catherine Manski, a lecturer in the Department of Education at the University of Illinois at Chicago. He has two children, educator Rebecca Manski and sociologist Ben Manski, and three grandchildren.

== Academic career ==
He received his B.S. and Ph.D. in economics from MIT in 1970 and 1973. He first taught at Carnegie Mellon University (1973–1980), moving on to the Hebrew University of Jerusalem (1978–1983), and joining the faculty of the University of Wisconsin–Madison (U.W., 1983–1998). While at the U.W., Manski served as Director of the Institute for Research on Poverty (1988–1991) and as chair of the Board of Overseers of the Panel Study of Income Dynamics (1994–1998). Since 1997 Manski has been Board of Trustees Professor in Economics at Northwestern University.

Manski has served as a member of the National Research Council's (NRC) Committee on National Statistics (1996–2000), and the Commission on Behavioral and Social Sciences and Education (1992–1998). At the NRC, he has been Chair of the Committee on Data and Research for Policy on Illegal Drugs (1998–2001) and a member of the Board on Mathematical Sciences and their Applications (2004–2007) and the Committee on Law and Justice (2009–). Manski is an elected fellow of the Econometric Society, The American Academy of Arts and Sciences, and the American Association for the Advancement of Science. In 2009, Manski was elected to the National Academy of Sciences; he is one of 2 economists elected to the body in 2009 and one of about 60 economists elected up to that point. In 2014 he was elected a Corresponding Fellow of the British Academy.

For 2025 he was awarded the BBVA Foundation Frontiers of Knowledge Award in the category "Economics, Finance and Management".

=== War on Drugs ===
Manski served on the NRC's Committee on Data and Research for Policy on Illegal Drugs, which studied the war on drugs. The committee report found that existing studies on efforts to address drug usage and smuggling, from US military operations to eradicate coca fields in Colombia, to domestic drug treatment centers, have all been inconclusive, if the programs have been evaluated at all: "The existing drug-use monitoring systems are strikingly inadequate to support the full range of policy decisions that the nation must make.... It is unconscionable for this country to continue to carry out a public policy of this magnitude and cost without any way of knowing whether and to what extent it is having the desired effect." The study was mentioned by the press but was initially ignored by policymakers, leading Manski to conclude, as one observer noted, that "the drug war has no interest in its own results."

== Research ==
Manski's work in econometrics includes the development of tools for partial identification, the maximum score estimator for discrete choice models, and work on the "reflection problem" in models of peer effects.

As of 2007, Manski's research interests focus primarily on the field of formation of social policy with partial knowledge of treatment response. Economists and doctors alike share a common interest in gauging the effect of various "treatments" delivered to "patients." Since research on treatment response rarely provides sufficient information to determine effectiveness, how should the available evidence be employed in choosing future treatments?

=== Election predictions ===
In 2004, Manski challenged the theoretical basis for statements in the popular media "that markets can predict an election better than polls and experts can."

== Selected publications ==
Partial identification

- C. Manski, Partial Identification of Probability Distributions, New York: Springer-Verlag, 2003.
- C. Manski, Identification for Prediction and Decision: Cambridge, Harvard University Press, 2007.

Identification of discrete choice models

- C. Manski, "Maximum Score Estimation of the Stochastic Utility Model of Choice," Journal of Econometrics, Vol. 3, No. 3, 1975, pp. 205–228.
- "Identification of Binary Response Models," Journal of the American Statistical Association, Vol. 83, No. 403, 1988, pp. 729–738.

Identification of social interactions

- C. Manski, "Identification of Endogenous Social Effects: The Reflection Problem," Review of Economic Studies, Vol. 60, No. 3, 1993, pp. 531–542.

Measurement of expectations in surveys

- C. Manski, "Measuring Expectations," Econometrica, Vol. 72, No. 5, 2004, pp. 1329–1376.

Other

- C. Manski, Social Choice with Partial Knowledge of Treatment Response, Princeton: Princeton University Press, 2005.
- C. Manski, "Diversified Treatment under Ambiguity," International Economic Review, 2009, forthcoming.
