= Underdetermination =

Idea in the philosophy of science

In the philosophy of science, underdetermination or the underdetermination of theory by data (sometimes abbreviated UTD) is the idea that evidence available to us at a given time may be insufficient to determine what beliefs we should hold in response to it. The underdetermination thesis states that all evidence necessarily underdetermines any scientific theory.

Underdetermination exists when available evidence is insufficient to identify which belief one should hold about that evidence. For example, if all that was known was that exactly $10 were spent on apples and oranges, and that apples cost $1 and oranges $2, then one would know enough to eliminate some possibilities (e.g., 6 oranges could not have been purchased), but one would not have enough evidence to know which specific combination of apples and oranges were purchased. In this example, one would say that belief in what combination was purchased is underdetermined by the available evidence.

In contrast, overdetermination in philosophy of science means that more evidence is available than is necessary to justify a conclusion.

== Origin ==
Ancient Greek skeptics argued for equipollence, the view that reasons for and against claims are equally balanced. This captures at least one sense of saying that the claims themselves are underdetermined.

Underdetermination, again under different labels, arises in the modern period in the work of René Descartes. Among other skeptical arguments, Descartes presents two arguments involving underdetermination. His dream argument points out that experiences perceived while dreaming (for example, falling) do not necessarily contain sufficient information to deduce the true situation (being in bed). He concluded that since one cannot always distinguish dreams from reality, one cannot rule out the possibility that one is dreaming rather than having veridical experiences; thus the conclusion that one is having a veridical experience is underdetermined. His demon argument posits that all of one's experiences and thoughts might be manipulated by a very powerful and deceptive "evil demon". Once again, so long as the perceived reality appears internally consistent to the limits of one's limited ability to tell, the situation is indistinguishable from reality and one cannot logically determine that such a demon does not exist.

== Underdetermination and evidence ==
To show that a conclusion is underdetermined, one must show that there is a rival conclusion that is equally well supported by the standards of evidence. A trivial example of underdetermination is the addition of the statement "whenever we look for evidence" (or more generally, any statement which cannot be falsified). For example, the conclusion "objects near Earth fall toward it when dropped" might be opposed by "objects near Earth fall toward it when dropped but only when one checks to see that they do." Since one may append this to any conclusion, all conclusions are at least trivially underdetermined. If one considers such statements to be illegitimate, e.g. by applying Occam's Razor, then such "tricks" are not considered demonstrations of underdetermination.

This concept also applies to scientific theories: for example, it is similarly trivial to find situations that a theory does not address. For example, classical mechanics did not distinguish between non-accelerating reference frames. As a result, any conclusion about such a reference frame was underdetermined; it was equally consistent with the theory to say that the Solar System is at rest, as it is to say that it moves at any constant velocity in any particular direction. Newton himself stated that these possibilities were indistinguishable. More generally, evidence may not always be sufficient to distinguish between competing theories (or to determine a different theory that will unify both), as is the case with general relativity and quantum mechanics.

Another example is provided by Johann Wolfgang von Goethe's 1810 book Theory of Colours: "Newton believed that with the help of his prism experiments, he could prove that sunlight was composed of variously coloured rays of light. Goethe showed that this step from observation to theory is more problematic than Newton wanted to admit. By insisting that the step to theory is not forced upon us by the phenomena, Goethe revealed our own free, creative contribution to theory construction. And Goethe's insight is surprisingly significant, because he correctly claimed that all of the results of Newton's prism experiments fit a theoretical alternative equally well. If this is correct, then by suggesting an alternative to a well-established physical theory, Goethe developed the problem of underdetermination a century before Duhem and Quine's famous argument." (Mueller, 2016) Hermann von Helmholtz says of this, "And I for one do not know how anyone, regardless of what his views about colours are, can deny that the theory in itself is fully consequent, that its assumptions, once granted, explain the facts treated completely and indeed simply".

Experimental violations of Bell inequality show, that there are some limitations to underdetermination – every theory exhibiting local realism and statistical independence was disproved by this tests. Analogous limitations follow from Kochen–Specker experiments. These tests employ only correlations between results of measurements and therefore are able to bypass the issue of theory-ladenness of observation.

== Arguments involving underdetermination ==
Arguments involving underdetermination attempt to show that there is no reason to believe some conclusion because it is underdetermined by the evidence. Then, if the evidence available at a particular time can be equally well explained by at least one other hypothesis, there is no reason to believe it rather than the equally supported rival, which can be considered observationally equivalent (although many other hypotheses may still be eliminated).

Because arguments involving underdetermination involve both a claim about what the evidence is and that such evidence underdetermines a conclusion, it is often useful to separate these two claims within the underdetermination argument as follows:

1. All the available evidence of a certain type underdetermines which of several rival conclusions is correct.
2. Only evidence of that type is relevant to believing one of these conclusions.
3. Therefore, there is no evidence for believing one among the rival conclusions.

The first premise makes the claim that a theory is underdetermined. The second says that rational decision (i.e. using available evidence) depends upon insufficient evidence.

=== Epistemological problem of the indeterminacy of data to theory ===
Any phenomenon can be explained by a multiplicity of hypotheses. How, then, can data ever be sufficient to prove a theory? This is the "epistemological problem of the indeterminacy of data to theory".

The poverty of the stimulus argument and W.V.O. Quine's 1960 'Gavagai' example are perhaps the most commented variants of the epistemological problem of the indeterminacy of data to theory.

=== General skeptical arguments ===
Some skeptical arguments appeal to the fact that no possible evidence could be incompatible with 'skeptical hypotheses' like the maintenance of a complex illusion by Descartes' evil demon or (in a modern version) the machines who run the Matrix. A skeptic may argue that this undermines any claims to knowledge, or even (by internalist definitions), justification.

Philosophers have found this argument very powerful. Hume felt it was unanswerable, but observed that it was in practice impossible to accept its conclusions. Influenced by this, Kant held that while the nature of the 'noumenal' world was indeed unknowable, we could aspire to knowledge of the 'phenomenal' world. A similar response has been advocated by modern anti-realists.

Underdetermined ideas are not implied to be incorrect (taking into account present evidence); rather, we cannot know if they are correct.

=== Philosophy of science ===
In the philosophy of science, underdetermination is often presented as a problem for scientific realism, which holds that we have reason to believe in entities that are not directly observable talked about by scientific theories. One such argument proceeds as follows (to be compared to the previous one):

1. All the available observational evidence for such entities underdetermines the claims of a scientific theory about such entities.
2. Only the observational evidence is relevant to believing a scientific theory.
3. Therefore, there is no evidence for believing what scientific theories say about such entities.

Particular responses to this argument attack both the first and the second premise (1 and 2). It is argued against the first premise that the underdetermination must be strong and/or inductive. It is argued against the second premise that there is evidence for a theory's truth besides observations; for example, it is argued that simplicity, explanatory power or some other feature of a theory is evidence for it over its rivals.

A more general response from the scientific realist is to argue that underdetermination is no special problem for science, because, as indicated earlier in this article, all knowledge that is directly or indirectly supported by evidence suffers from it—for example, conjectures concerning unobserved observables. It is therefore too powerful an argument to have any significance in the philosophy of science, since it does not cast doubt uniquely on conjectured unobservables.

== See also ==
- Indeterminacy (philosophy)
- Poverty of the stimulus
- Reference class problem
- Scientific method
- Instrumentalism
- Confirmation holism
- Equifinality
- Metaphysics
- Occam's razor
- Observational equivalence
- Overdetermination
- Philosophical skepticism
