= LIML =

LIML may refer to:

- Linate Airport (ICAO airport code)
- Limited information maximum likelihood, a method for estimating the linear simultaneous equations model in econometrics
