= Pierre Duhem =

French physicist (1861–1916)

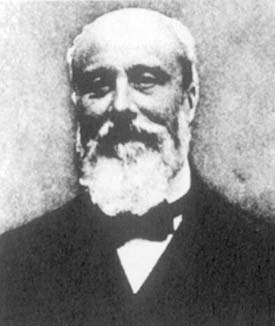
- Born: Pierre Maurice Marie Duhem; 9 June 1861; Paris, France
- Died: 14 September 1916 (aged 55); Cabrespine, France
- Education: École Normale Supérieure (licentiate, 1884); University of Paris (doctorate, 1888)
- Known for: Clausius–Duhem inequality Gibbs–Duhem equation Duhem–Margules equation Duhem–Quine thesis Confirmation holism Thermodynamic potential Energeticism; Historical epistemology Conventionalism
- Scientific career
- Fields: Thermodynamics, philosophy of science, history of science
- Workplaces: University of Bordeaux
- Thesis: De l'aimantation par influence (1888)

Pierre Maurice Marie Duhem (French: [pjɛʁ mɔʁis maʁi dy.ɛm, moʁ-]; 9 June 1861 – 14 September 1916) was a French theoretical physicist who made significant contributions to thermodynamics, hydrodynamics, and the theory of elasticity. Duhem was also a prolific historian of science, noted especially for his pioneering work on the European Middle Ages. As a philosopher of science, Duhem is credited with the "Duhem–Quine thesis" on the indeterminacy of experimental criteria. Duhem's opposition to positivism was partly informed by his traditionalist Catholicism, an outlook that put him at odds with the dominant academic currents in France during his lifetime.

== Early life and education ==
Pierre Duhem was born in Paris on 10 June 1861. He was the son of Pierre-Joseph Duhem, who was of Flemish origins, and Marie Alexandrine née Fabre, whose family hailed from Languedoc. Pierre-Joseph worked as a sales representative in the textile industry and the family lived in a modest neighborhood on the Rue des Jeûneurs, just south of Monmartre. The family was devoutly Catholic and its conservative outlook was influenced by having lived through the Paris Commune of 1871, which the Duhems saw as a manifestation of the anarchy that must follow from the rejection of religion.

The young Pierre completed his secondary studies at the Collège Stanislas, where his interest in the physical sciences was encouraged by his teacher Jules Moutier, who was a theoretical physicist and the author of influential textbooks on thermodynamics. Pierre was admitted as the first-ranked of his cohort at the prestigious École normale supérieure (ENS) in 1882. At the ENS, he completed licentiates in mathematics and physics in 1884. He then earned his agrégation in physical sciences in 1885.

Duhem prepared a doctoral thesis on the use of the thermodynamic potential in the theory of electrochemical cells. In his thesis, Duhem explicitly attacked the "principle of maximum work" as framed by Marcellin Berthelot. The jury rejected that thesis and Duhem's academic career appears to have been hampered ever after by his differences with Barthelot. In addition to their scientific disagreements, Duhem was a conservative Catholic and royalist, whereas the politically powerful Barthelot was an anti-clerical republican. In 1888 Duhem finally received his doctorate with a new thesis on the theory of magnetization dynamics.

Despite his accomplishments as a theoretical physicist, and later as a historian and philosopher of science, Duhem never obtained the academic position in Paris that he sought. He found work first at the University of Lille (1887–1893), then briefly at the University of Rennes (1893–1894), and finally as a professor of theoretical physics at the University of Bordeaux, where he was based for the rest of his career.

== Theoretical physics ==
Among scientists, Duhem is best known today for his work on chemical thermodynamics, and in particular for the Gibbs–Duhem and Duhem–Margules equations. His approach was strongly influenced by the early works of Josiah Willard Gibbs, which Duhem effectively explained and promoted among French scientists. In continuum mechanics, he is also remembered for his contribution to what is now called the Clausius–Duhem inequality.

Duhem was a supporter of energetics and was convinced that all physical phenomena, including mechanics, electromagnetism, and chemistry, could be derived from the principles of thermodynamics. Influenced by William Rankine's "Outlines of the Science of Energetics", Duhem carried out this intellectual project in his Traité de l'Énergétique (1911), but was ultimately unable to reduce electromagnetic phenomena to thermodynamic first principles.

Duhem shared Ernst Mach's skepticism about the physical reality and usefulness of the concept of atoms. He therefore did not follow the statistical mechanics of James Clerk Maxwell, Ludwig Boltzmann, and Gibbs, who explained the laws of thermodynamics in terms of the statistical properties of mechanical systems composed of many atoms.

Duhem was an opponent of Albert Einstein's theory of relativity. In 1914, Duhem commented that Einstein's relativity theory "has turned physics into a real chaos where logic loses its way and common-sense runs away frightened". In his 1915 book La Science Allemande, he argued strongly against relativity. Duhem stated that the theory of relativity "overthrow[s] all the doctrines in which one has spoken of space, of time, of movement, all the theories of mechanics and of physics".

== History of science ==
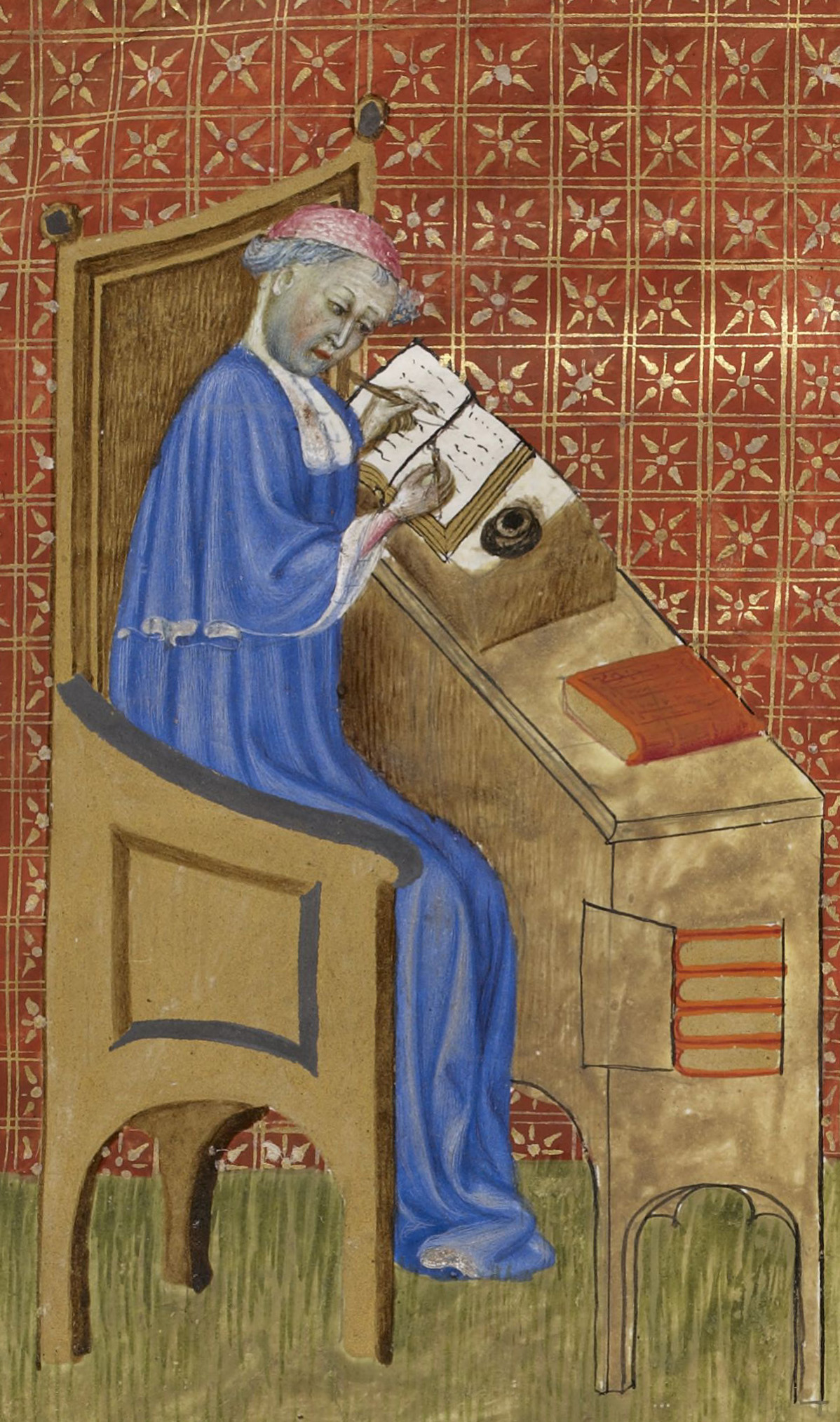
Nicole Oresme, a prominent medieval scholar. Duhem came to regard the medieval scholastic tradition as the origin of modern science.

Duhem is well known for his work on the history of science, which resulted in the ten volume Le système du monde: histoire des doctrines cosmologiques de Platon à Copernic (The System of World: A History of Cosmological Doctrines from Plato to Copernicus). As a traditionalist Catholic, Duhem rejected the Enlightened conception of the European Middle Ages as intellectually barren. Instead, he endeavored to show that the Medieval Church had helped to foster the growth of Western science. Duhem's work as a historian of medieval science began with his research on the origins of statics, in the course of which he encountered the works of medieval mathematicians and philosophers such as John Buridan, Nicole Oresme, and Roger Bacon. Duhem came to see in them the true founders of modern science, who in his view had anticipated many of the discoveries of Galileo Galilei and later early modern scientists. Duhem claimed that "the mechanics and physics of which modern times are justifiably proud" had proceeded, "by an uninterrupted series of scarcely perceptible improvements, from doctrines professed in the heart of the medieval schools."

Duhem helped to reintroduce the concept of "saving the phenomena" into the modern philosophy of science. In addition to the debates of the Copernican Revolution on "saving the phenomena" (σῴζειν τὰ φαινόμενα, sozein ta phainomena, contrasted with providing a physical explanation), Duhem was motivated by the thinking of Thomas Aquinas, who wrote concerning the epicycles and eccentrics of classical astronomy that

Reason may be employed in two ways to establish a point: firstly, for the purpose of furnishing sufficient proof of some principle [...] Reason is employed in another way, not as furnishing a sufficient proof of a principle, but as confirming an already established principle, by showing the congruity of its results, as in astronomy the theory of eccentrics and epicycles is considered as established, because thereby the sensible appearances of the heavenly movements can be explained; not, however, as if this proof were sufficient, forasmuch as some other theory might explain them.

== Philosophy of science ==
A theory of physics is not an explanation. It is a system of mathematical propositions, deduced from a small number of principles, which have for their aim to represent as simply, as completely and as exactly as possible, a group of experimental laws.

— Duhem, The Aim and Structure of Physical Theory, vol 13, p. 19

In the philosophy of science, Duhem is best known for arguing that hypotheses are not straightforwardly refuted by experiment and that there are no crucial experiments in science. Duhem’s formulation of his thesis is that “if the predicted phenomenon is not produced, not only is the questioned proposition put into doubt, but also the whole theoretical scaffolding used by the physicist”. Duhem's views on the philosophy of science are explained in his 1906 work The Aim and Structure of Physical Theory. In this work, he opposed Newton's statement that the Principia's law of universal mutual gravitation was deduced from 'phenomena', including Kepler's second and third laws. Newton's claims in this regard had already been attacked by critical proof-analyses of the German logician Leibniz and then most famously by Immanuel Kant, following Hume's logical critique of induction. But the novelty of Duhem's work was his proposal that Newton's theory of universal mutual gravity flatly contradicted Kepler's Laws of planetary motion because the interplanetary mutual gravitational perturbations caused deviations from Keplerian orbits. Since no contingent proposition can be validly logically deduced from any it contradicts, according to Duhem, Newton must not have logically deduced his law of gravitation directly from Kepler's Laws.

=== Opposition to the English inductivist tradition ===
Duhem argues that physics is subject to certain methodological limitations that do not affect other sciences. In his The Aim and Structure of Physical Theory (1906), Duhem critiqued the Baconian notion of "crucial experiments". According to this critique, an experiment in physics is not simply an observation, but rather an interpretation of observations by means of a theoretical framework. Furthermore, no matter how well one constructs one's experiment, it is impossible to subject an isolated single hypothesis to an experimental test. Instead, it is a whole interlocking group of hypotheses, background assumptions, and theories that is tested. This thesis has come to be known as confirmation holism. This inevitable holism, according to Duhem, renders crucial experiments impossible. More generally, Duhem was critical of Newton's description of the method of physics as a straightforward "deduction" from facts and observations.

=== Duhem's philosophy of science and faith ===
In the appendix to The Aim and Structure, entitled "Physics of a Believer," Duhem draws out the implications that he sees his philosophy of science as having for those who argue that there is a conflict between physics and religion. He writes, "metaphysical and religious doctrines are judgments touching on objective reality, whereas the principles of physical theory are propositions relative to certain mathematical signs stripped of all objective existence. Since they do not have any common term, these two sorts of judgments can neither contradict nor agree with each other" (p. 285). Nonetheless, Duhem argues that it is important for the theologian or metaphysician to have detailed knowledge of physical theory in order not to make illegitimate use of it in speculations. Duhem's philosophy of science was criticized by one of his contemporaries, Abel Rey, in part because of what Rey perceived as influence on the part of Duhem's Catholic faith. Although Duhem was indeed a believer, a sincere and fervent Catholic, he was eager to point out that his works in physics and chemistry should be considered on their own merits, independent of his religion. They were not examples of "Catholic science," nor even colored by his Catholic faith. (Note: Duhem 1991b: "Whatever I have said of the method by which physics proceeds, or of the nature and scope that we must attribute to the theories it constructs, does not in any way prejudice either the metaphysical doctrines or the religious beliefs of anyone who accepts my words. The believer and the nonbeliever may both work in common accord for the progress of physical science such as I have tried to define it. [...] In itself and by its essence, any principle of theoretical physics has no part to play in metaphysical or theological discussions.")

== Honors and death ==
Duhem received an honorary doctorate from the Jagiellonian University, in Kraków, Poland, in 1900. On that same year he was elected as a corresponding member of the French Academy of Sciences. He was promoted to titular non-resident member in 1913. Towards the end of his life, Duhem was recommended as a candidate for the chair of History of Science at the prestigious Collège de France, in Paris. Duhem, however, refused to be considered for the position, explaining in a letter to his daughter that "I am a theoretical physicist. Either I will teach theoretical physics at Paris or else I will not go there." He died suddenly in 1916, at the relatively early age of 55, after suffering from an acute attack of angina while staying in a home that had belonged to his maternal grandfather in the small commune of Cabrespine, near the city of Carcassonne, in the southern department of the Aude.

== Works ==
Books

- (1886). Le Potentiel Thermodynamique et ses Applications à la Mécanique Chimique et à l'Étude des Phénomènes Électriques. Paris: A. Hermann.
- (1888). De l'Aimantation par Influence. Suivi de Propositions Données par la Faculté. Paris, Gauthier-Villars et Fils.
- (1891). Cours de Physique Mathématique et de Cristallographie de la Faculté des Sciences de Lille. Paris: A. Hermann.
- (1891–1892). Leçons sur l'Électricité et le Magnétisme. Paris: Gauthier-Villars et Fils, tome I (English EPUB), tome II (English EPUB), tome III (English EPUB).
- (1893). Introduction à la Mécanique Chimique. Paris: G. Carré.
- (1894). Sur les Déformations Permanentes et l'Hysteresis. Bruxelles: Impr. de Hayez.
- (1895). Les Théories de la Chaleur.
- (1896). Théorie Thermodynamique de la Viscosité, du Frottement et des faux Équilibres Chimiques. Paris: A. Hermann.
- (1897–1898). Traité Élémentaire de Mécanique Chimique Fondée sur la Thermodynamique. Paris: A. Hermann.
  - (1897). Les Mélanges Doubles: Statique Chimique Générale des Systèmes Hétérogènes.
  - (1898). Faux Équilibres et Explosions.
- (1902). Le Mixte et la Combinaison Chimique. Essai sur l'Évolution d'une Idée. Paris: C. Naud.
- (1902). Les Théories Électriques de J. Clerk Maxwell: Étude Historique et Critique. Paris: A. Hermann.
- (1902). Thermodynamique et Chimie: Leçons Élémentaires à l'Usage des Chimistes. Paris: A. Hermann.
- (1903). Recherches sur l'Hydrodynamique. Paris: Gauthier-Villars.
- (1905–6). Les Origines de la Statique. Paris: A. Herman, tome I, tome II.
- (1905). L'Évolution de la Mécanique. Paris, A. Hermann.
- (1906). La Théorie Physique. Son Objet, sa Structure. Paris: Chevalier & Riviére (Vrin, 2007).
- (1906). Recherches sur l'Élasticité. Paris: Gauthier-Villars.
- (1906–13). Études sur Léonard de Vinci, ceux qu'il a lus et ceux qui l'ont lu, 3 vol., Paris: A. Hermann.
  - Première série : Ceux qu'il a lus et ceux qui l'ont lu, 1906.
  - Deuxième série : Ceux qu'il a lus et ceux qui l'ont lu, 1909.
  - Troisième série : Les précurseurs parisiens de Galilée, 1913.
- (1908). Josiah-Willard Gibbs, à propos de la Publication de ses Mémoires Scientifiques. Paris: A. Hermann.
- (1908). Sauver les Phénomènes. Essai sur la Notion de Théorie Physique de Platon à Galilée. Paris: A. Hermann (Vrin, 2005).
- (1909). Le Mouvement Absolu et le Mouvement Relatif. Paris: Impr. Librairie de Montligeon. English EPUB
- (1911). Traité d'Énergétique. Paris: Gauthier-Villars, tome I (English EPUB), tome II (English EPUB).
- (1913–1959). Le Système du Monde. Histoire des Doctrines Cosmologiques de Platon à Copernic: tome I, tome II, tome III, tome IV, tome V, tome VI, tome VII, tome VIII, tome IX, tome X.
- (1915) La Science Allemande. Paris: A. Hermann.

Articles

- (1908). "La Valeur de la Théorie Physique," Journal de Mathémathiques Pures et Appliquées, Vol. XIX, pp. 7–19.
- (1908). "Ce que l'on Disait des Indes Occidentales avant Christophe Colomb," Journal de Mathémathiques Pures et Appliquées, Vol. XIX, pp. 402–406.
- (1909). "Note: Thierry de Chartres et Nicholas de Cues," Revues des Sciences Philosophiques et Théologiques, Troisième Année, pp. 525–531.
- (1911). "Sur les Petites Oscillations d'un Corps Flottant," Journal de Mathémathiques Pures et Appliquées, Vol. VII, Sixiéme Série, pp. 1–84.
- (1911). "Le Temps selon les Philosophes Hellénes," Part II, Revue de Philosophie, Vol. XIX, pp. 5–24, 128–145.
- (1914). "Roger Bacon et l'Horreur du Vide," in A.G. Little (ed.), Roger Bacon Essays. Oxford, at the Clarendon Press.
- (1915). "Quelques Réflexions sur la Science Allemande," Revue des Deux Mondes, Vol. XXV, pp. 657–686.
- (1916). "L'Optique de Malebranche," Revue de Métaphysique et de Morale, Vol. XXIII, No. 1, pp. 37–91.

Duhem's mathematics papers from NUMDAM

=== Works in English translation ===
- Duhem, Pierre (1903). Thermodynamics and Chemistry. A Non-mathematical Treatise for Chemists and Students of Chemistry (1st ed.). New York; London: J. Wiley & Sons; Chapman & Hall. OCLC 3383130.
- Duhem, Pierre (1991b) [Originally published 1906]. The Aim and Structure of Physical Theory. Translated by Wiener, Philip P. (2nd ed.). Princeton: Princeton University Press. Excerpts: excerpt 1, & excerpt 2 "Heavenly bodies: Theory, physics and philosophy"
- "Physical Theory and Experiment," in Herbert Feigl & May Brodbeck (ed.), Readings in the Philosophy of Science. New York: Appleton-Century-Crofts, Inc., 1953, pp. 235–252.
- Duhem, Pierre (1969). To Save the Phenomena, an Essay on the Idea of Physical Theory from Plato to Galileo. Chicago: University of Chicago Press. OCLC 681213472. (excerpt)
- Duhem, Pierre (1985). Medieval Cosmology: Theories of Infinity, Place, Time, Void, and the Plurality of Worlds. Chicago: University of Chicago Press. ISBN 978-0-226-16922-4. OCLC 712044683. (excerpt: "The 12th century birth of the notion of mass which advised modern mechanics ... and void and movement in the void")
- Duhem, Pierre (1988). The Physicist as Artist: The Landscapes of Pierre Duhem. Edinburgh: Scottish Academic Press. ISBN 0707305349
- Duhem, Pierre (1990). "Logical Examination of Physical Theory," Synthese, Vol. 83, No. 2, pp. 183–188.
- Duhem, Pierre (1990). "Research on the History of Physical Theories," Synthese, Vol. 83, No. 2, pp. 189–200.
- Duhem, Pierre (1991). German Science. La Salle, Ill.: Open Court. ISBN 0812691245
- Duhem, Pierre (1991c). The Origins of Statics The Sources of Physical Theory. Boston Studies in the Philosophy of Science. Vol. 123. Dordrecht: Springer Netherlands. doi:10.1007/978-94-011-3730-0. ISBN 9789401137300.
- Duhem, Pierre (1996). Essays in the History and Philosophy of Science. Indianapolis: Hackett Pub. Co. ISBN 978-0-87220-308-2. OCLC 33968944.
- Duhem, Pierre (2011). Commentary on the Principles of Thermodynamics by Pierre Duhem. Dordrecht; New York: Springer. ISBN 978-94-007-0311-7. OCLC 733543752.
- Duhem, Pierre Maurice Marie (2015). The Electric Theories of J. Clerk Maxwell. Boston Studies in the Philosophy and History of Science. Vol. 314. Alan Aversa (trans.). Cham: Springer International Publishing. doi:10.1007/978-3-319-18515-6. ISBN 978-3-319-18515-6.
- Duhem, Pierre Maurice Marie (2018-06-29). Galileo's Precursors: Translation of Studies on Leonardo da Vinci (vol. 3). Alan Aversa (trans.). doi:10.13140/RG.2.2.23235.71201/1.
- Duhem, Pierre Maurice Marie (2018-09-09). Ampère's Force Law: A Modern Introduction. Alan Aversa (trans.). doi:10.13140/RG.2.2.31100.03206/1. (EPUB)

Articles

- "Physics & Metaphysics" (1893)
- "Physics of a Believer"

Articles contributed to the 1912 Catholic Encyclopedia

- History of Physics
- Pierre de Maricourt
- Jordanus de Nemore
- Nicole Oresme
- Albert of Saxony
- Thierry of Freburg
- Jean de Sax

The above bibliography is not exhaustive. See his complete primary sources and secondary sources at the Duhem entry of the Stanford Encyclopedia of Philosophy.

== See also ==
- Theory-ladenness

== Sources ==
- Dijksterhuis, E.J. (1959). "The Origins of Classical Mechanics from Aristotle to Newton", in M. Clagett (ed). Critical Problems in the History of Science, pp. 163–184. University of Wisconsin Press.
- Pierre-Duhem, Hélène (2025-12-02). Pierre Duhem: A French Scholar [Pierre Duhem: Un savant français in archive.org, Librairie Plon, Paris (1936)]. Alan Aversa (trans.). New Hope, KY: Real View Books. doi:10.1007/978-94-009-3623-2_7. ISBN 978-1-892548-50-4. (PDF, EPUB)
- Hentschel, Klaus (1988). "Die Korrespondenz Duhem-Mach: Zur 'Modellbeladenheit' von Wissenschaftsgeschichte", Annals of Science, 73–91.
- Kragh, Helge (2008). "Pierre Duhem, Entropy, and Christian Faith". Physics in Perspective. 10 (4): 379–395. Bibcode:2008PhP....10..379K. doi:10.1007/s00016-007-0365-z. S2CID 122079983.
- Lowinger, Armand (1941). The Methodology of Pierre Duhem. Columbia University Press.
- Martin, R. N. D. (1991). Pierre Duhem: Philosophy and History in the Work of a Believing Physicist. Open Court. ISBN 978-0-8126-9160-3.
- Massey, Gerald J. (2011). "Quine and Duhem on holistic hypothesis testing". American Philosophical Quarterly. 48 (3): 239–266.
- Miller, Donald G. (1970). "Pierre Duhem". In Gillispie, Charles (ed.). Dictionary of Scientific Biography. Vol. 3. New York: Scribner & American Council of Learned Societies. pp. 225–233. ISBN 978-0-684-10114-9.
- Moody, Ernest A. (1951). "Galileo and Avempace: The Dynamics of the Leaning Tower Experiment". Journal of the History of Ideas. 12 (3): 375–422. doi:10.2307/2707752. JSTOR 2707752.
- Moody, Ernest A. (1966). "Galileo and his Precursors", in C.L. Gollino, ed., Galileo Reappraised. Berkeley: University of California Press, 23–43.
- Martin, R. N. D. (1991). Pierre Duhem: Philosophy and History in the Work of a Believing Physicist. Open Court. ISBN 978-0-8126-9160-3.
- Needham, Paul (2008). "Pierre Duhem". Dictionary of Scientific Biography.
- Page, Meghan D. (17 January 2018). "Sense and Reference of a Believer". American Catholic Philosophical Quarterly. 92: 145–157. doi:10.5840/acpq2018116143.
- Picard, Émile (1922). "La Vie et l'Oeuvre de Pierre Duhem," in Discours et Mélanges. Paris: Gauthier-Villars.
- Rey, Abel (1904). "La philosophie scientifique de M. Duhem". Revue de Métaphysique et de Morale. 12: 699–744.
- Stoffel, Jean-François; Stanley L. Jaki (1996). Pierre Duhem et ses Doctorands: Bibliographie de la Littérature Primaire et Secondaire. Centre Interfacultaire d'Étude en Histoire des Sciences. p. 325. ISBN 978-2-930175-00-3.
- Stoffel, Jean-François; Jean Ladrière (2002). Le Phénoménalisme Problématique de Pierre Duhem. Brussels: Classe des Lettres, Académie Royale de Belgique. p. 391. ISBN 978-2-8031-0190-0.
