= Francesca Molinari =

Italian economist

Francesca Molinari is an Italian economist and economic statististician specializing in theoretical and applied econometrics, whose research topics include risk aversion, survey methodology, and set identification. She is H. T. Warshow and Robert Irving Warshow Professor of Economics and Professor of Statistics at Cornell University.

== Education and career ==
Molinari earned a laurea in economics from the University of Turin in 1997, a master's degree from CORIPE Piemonte in 1998, and a Ph.D. from Northwestern University in 2003. Her dissertation, Contaminated, Corrupted, and Missing Data, was supervised by Charles F. Manski. It won the Arnold Zellner Thesis Award in Econometrics and Statistics of the Business and Economic Statistics Section of the American Statistical Association.

She became an assistant professor of economics at Cornell University in 2003, was tenured as an associate professor in 2009, added a joint appointment in statistics in 2013, and was promoted to full professor in 2014. She was given the H. T. Warshow and Robert Irving Warshow Professorship in 2017.

== Book ==
With Ilya Molchanov, Molinari is the co-author of the book Random Sets in Econometrics (Econometric Society Monographs, 60, Cambridge University Press, 2018).

== Recognition ==
Molinari was elected as a Fellow of the International Association for Applied Econometrics in 2019, and as a Fellow of the Econometric Society in 2020.
