= Clausius–Duhem inequality =

Thermodynamic law expression

The Clausius–Duhem inequality is a way of expressing the second law of thermodynamics that is used in continuum mechanics. This inequality is particularly useful in determining whether the constitutive relation of a material is thermodynamically allowable.

This inequality is a statement concerning the irreversibility of natural processes, especially when energy dissipation is involved. It was named after the German physicist Rudolf Clausius and French physicist Pierre Duhem.

== Clausius–Duhem inequality in terms of the specific entropy ==
The Clausius–Duhem inequality can be expressed in integral form as

$$\frac{d}{dt}\left(\int_\Omega \rho \eta \, dV\right) \ge
\int_{\partial \Omega} \rho \eta \left(u_n - \mathbf{v}\cdot\mathbf{n}\right) dA -
\int_{\partial \Omega} \frac{\mathbf{q}\cdot\mathbf{n}}{T}~ dA +
\int_\Omega \frac{\rho s}{T}~dV.$$

In this equation $t$ is the time, $\Omega$ represents a body and the integration is over the volume of the body, $\partial \Omega$ represents the surface of the body, $\rho$ is the mass density of the body, $\eta$ is the specific entropy (entropy per unit mass), $u_n$ is the normal velocity of $\partial \Omega$, $\mathbf{v}$ is the velocity of particles inside $\Omega$, $\mathbf{n}$ is the unit normal to the surface, $\mathbf{q}$ is the heat flux vector, $s$ is an energy source per unit mass, and $T$ is the absolute temperature. All the variables are functions of a material point at $\mathbf{x}$ at time $t$.

In differential form the Clausius–Duhem inequality can be written as

$$\rho \dot{\eta} \ge - \boldsymbol{\nabla} \cdot \left(\frac{\mathbf{q}}{T}\right)
+ \frac{\rho~s}{T}$$

where $\dot{\eta}$ is the time derivative of $\eta$ and $\boldsymbol{\nabla} \cdot (\mathbf{a})$ is the divergence of the vector $\mathbf{a}$.

Proof

Assume that $\Omega$ is an arbitrary fixed control volume. Then $u_n = 0$ and the derivative can be taken inside the integral to give

$$\int_\Omega \frac{\partial }{\partial t}(\rho~\eta)~dV \ge
-\int_{\partial \Omega} \rho~\eta~(\mathbf{v}\cdot\mathbf{n})~dA -
\int_{\partial \Omega} \cfrac{\mathbf{q}\cdot\mathbf{n}}{T}~dA +
\int_\Omega \cfrac{\rho~s}{T}~dV.$$

Using the divergence theorem, we get

$$\int_\Omega \frac{\partial }{\partial t} (\rho~\eta)~ dV \ge
-\int_\Omega \boldsymbol{\nabla} \cdot (\rho~\eta~\mathbf{v})~dV -
\int_\Omega \boldsymbol{\nabla} \cdot \left(\frac{\mathbf{q}}{T}\right)~dV +
\int_\Omega \frac{\rho s}{T}~dV.$$

Since $\Omega$ is arbitrary, we must have

$$\frac{\partial }{\partial t}(\rho~\eta) \ge
-\boldsymbol{\nabla} \cdot (\rho~\eta~\mathbf{v}) -
\boldsymbol{\nabla} \cdot \left(\frac{\mathbf{q}}{T}\right) +
\frac{\rho s}{T}.$$

Expanding out

$$\frac{\partial \rho}{\partial t}~\eta + \rho~\frac{\partial \eta}{\partial t}  \ge
-\boldsymbol{\nabla} (\rho~\eta) \cdot \mathbf{v} - \rho~\eta~(\boldsymbol{\nabla} \cdot \mathbf{v}) -
\boldsymbol{\nabla} \cdot \left(\frac{\mathbf{q}}{T}\right) +
\frac{\rho~s}{T}$$

or,

$$\frac{\partial \rho}{\partial t}~\eta + \rho~\frac{\partial \eta}{\partial t}  \ge
-\eta~\boldsymbol{\nabla} \rho\cdot\mathbf{v} - \rho~\boldsymbol{\nabla} \eta\cdot\mathbf{v} -
\rho~\eta~(\boldsymbol{\nabla} \cdot \mathbf{v}) -
\boldsymbol{\nabla} \cdot \left(\cfrac{\mathbf{q}}{T}\right) +
\cfrac{\rho~s}{T}$$

or,

$$\left(\frac{\partial \rho}{\partial t} + \boldsymbol{\nabla} \rho\cdot\mathbf{v} + \rho~\boldsymbol{\nabla} \cdot \mathbf{v}\right)
~\eta +
\rho~\left(\frac{\partial \eta}{\partial t} + \boldsymbol{\nabla} \eta\cdot\mathbf{v}\right)
\ge -\boldsymbol{\nabla} \cdot \left(\cfrac{\mathbf{q}}{T}\right) +
\cfrac{\rho~s}{T}.$$

Now, the material time derivatives of $\rho$ and $\eta$ are given by

$$\dot{\rho} = \frac{\partial \rho}{\partial t} + \boldsymbol{\nabla} \rho\cdot\mathbf{v} ~;~~
\dot{\eta} = \frac{\partial \eta}{\partial t} + \boldsymbol{\nabla} \eta\cdot\mathbf{v}.$$

Therefore,

$$\left(\dot{\rho} + \rho~\boldsymbol{\nabla} \cdot \mathbf{v}\right)~\eta +
\rho~\dot{\eta}
\ge -\boldsymbol{\nabla} \cdot \left(\cfrac{\mathbf{q}}{T}\right) +
\cfrac{\rho~s}{T}.$$

From the conservation of mass $\dot{\rho} + \rho~\boldsymbol{\nabla} \cdot \mathbf{v} = 0$. Hence,

$$\rho~\dot{\eta} \ge -\boldsymbol{\nabla} \cdot \left(\cfrac{\mathbf{q}}{T}\right) +
\cfrac{\rho~s}{T}.$$

== Clausius–Duhem inequality in terms of specific internal energy ==
The inequality can be expressed in terms of the internal energy as

$$\rho~(\dot{e} - T~\dot{\eta}) - \boldsymbol{\sigma}:\boldsymbol{\nabla}\mathbf{v} \le
- \cfrac{\mathbf{q}\cdot\boldsymbol{\nabla} T}{T}$$

where $\dot{e}$ is the time derivative of the specific internal energy $e$ (the internal energy per unit mass), $\boldsymbol{\sigma}$ is the Cauchy stress, and $\boldsymbol{\nabla}\mathbf{v}$ is the gradient of the velocity. This inequality incorporates the balance of energy and the balance of linear and angular momentum into the expression for the Clausius–Duhem inequality.

Proof

Using the identity $\boldsymbol{\nabla} \cdot (\varphi~\mathbf{v}) = \varphi~\boldsymbol{\nabla} \cdot \mathbf{v} + \mathbf{v}\cdot\boldsymbol{\nabla} \varphi$ in the Clausius–Duhem inequality, we get

$$\rho~\dot{\eta}  \ge  - \boldsymbol{\nabla} \cdot \left(\frac{\mathbf{q}}{T}\right)
+ \frac{\rho~s}{T}  \qquad \text{or} \qquad
\rho~\dot{\eta}  \ge - \frac{1}{T} ~ \boldsymbol{\nabla} \cdot \mathbf{q} -
\mathbf{q}\cdot\boldsymbol{\nabla} \left(\frac{1}{T}\right)
+ \frac{\rho~s}{T}.$$

Now, using index notation with respect to a Cartesian coordinate system $\mathbf{e}_j$,

$$\boldsymbol{\nabla} \left(\cfrac{1}{T}\right) =
\frac{\partial }{\partial x_j} \left(T^{-1}\right) ~\mathbf{e}_j =
-\left(T^{-2}\right)~\frac{\partial T}{\partial x_j}~\mathbf{e}_j
= -\frac{1}{T^2}~\boldsymbol{\nabla} T.$$

Hence,

$$\rho~\dot{\eta} \ge - \cfrac{1}{T}~\boldsymbol{\nabla} \cdot \mathbf{q} +
\cfrac{1}{T^2}~\mathbf{q}\cdot\boldsymbol{\nabla} T
+ \frac{\rho~s}{T} \qquad\text{or}\qquad
\rho~\dot{\eta} \ge -\cfrac{1}{T}\left(\boldsymbol{\nabla} \cdot \mathbf{q} - \rho~s\right) +
\frac{1}{T^2}~\mathbf{q}\cdot\boldsymbol{\nabla} T.$$

From the balance of energy

$$\rho~\dot{e} - \boldsymbol{\sigma}:\boldsymbol{\nabla}\mathbf{v} + \boldsymbol{\nabla} \cdot \mathbf{q} - \rho~s = 0
\qquad \implies \qquad
\rho~\dot{e} - \boldsymbol{\sigma}:\boldsymbol{\nabla}\mathbf{v} = - (\boldsymbol{\nabla} \cdot \mathbf{q} - \rho~s).$$

Therefore,

$$\rho~\dot{\eta} \ge \frac{1}{T} \left(\rho~\dot{e}-\boldsymbol{\sigma}:\boldsymbol{\nabla}\mathbf{v}\right) +
\frac{1}{T^2}~\mathbf{q}\cdot\boldsymbol{\nabla} T
\qquad \implies \qquad
\rho~\dot{\eta}~T \ge \rho~\dot{e}-\boldsymbol{\sigma}:\boldsymbol{\nabla}\mathbf{v} +
\frac{\mathbf{q}\cdot\boldsymbol{\nabla} T}{T}.$$

Rearranging,

$$\rho~(\dot{e} - T~\dot{\eta}) - \boldsymbol{\sigma}:\boldsymbol{\nabla}\mathbf{v} \le
- \frac{\mathbf{q}\cdot \boldsymbol{\nabla} T}{T}$$

Q.E.D.

== Dissipation ==
The quantity

$$\mathcal{D} = \rho~(T~\dot{\eta}-\dot{e}) + \boldsymbol{\sigma}:\boldsymbol{\nabla}\mathbf{v}
- \cfrac{\mathbf{q}\cdot\boldsymbol{\nabla} T}{T} \ge 0$$

is called the dissipation which is defined as the rate of internal entropy production per unit volume times the absolute temperature. Hence the Clausius–Duhem inequality is also called the dissipation inequality. In a real material, the dissipation is always greater than zero.

== See also ==
- Entropy
- Second law of thermodynamics
