= Confirmation holism =

Idea in the philosophy of science

In philosophy of science, confirmation holism, or epistemological holism, is the view that no individual statement can be confirmed or disconfirmed by an empirical test, but rather that only a set of statements (a whole theory) can be. It is attributed to Willard Van Orman Quine who motivated his holism through extending Pierre Duhem's problem of underdetermination in physical theory to all knowledge claims.

Duhem's idea was roughly that no theory of any type can be tested in isolation, rather only when embedded in a background of other hypotheses, e.g. hypotheses about initial conditions. Quine thought that this background involved not only such hypotheses but also our whole web of belief, which, among other things, includes our mathematical and logical theories and our scientific theories. This last claim is sometimes known as the Duhem–Quine thesis.

A related claim made by Quine, though contested by some (see Adolf Grünbaum 1962), is that one can always protect one's theory against refutation by attributing failure to some other part of our web of belief. In his own words, "Any statement can be held true come what may, if we make drastic enough adjustments elsewhere in the system."

== Underdetermination in physical theory ==
By 1845 astronomers found that the orbit of planet Uranus around the Sun departed from expectations. Not concluding that Newton's law of universal gravitation was flawed, however, astronomers John Couch Adams as well as Urbain Le Verrier independently predicted a new planet, eventually known as Neptune, and even calculated its weight and orbit through Newton's theory. (Note: From wikipedia: Discovery of Neptune) And yet neither did this empirical success of Newton's theory verify Newton's theory.

Le Verrier soon reported that Mercury's perihelion—the peak of its orbital ellipse nearest to the Sun—advanced each time Mercury completed an orbit, a phenomenon not predicted by Newton's theory, which astrophysicists were so confident in that they predicted a new planet, named Vulcan, which a number of astronomers subsequently claimed to have seen. In 1905, however, Einstein's special theory of relativity claimed that space and time are both relative, refuting the very framework of Newton's theory that claimed that space and time were both absolute.

In 1915, Einstein's general theory of relativity newly explained gravitation while precisely predicting Mercury's orbit. In 1919, astrophysicist Arthur Eddington led an expedition to test Einstein's prediction of the Sun's mass reshaping spacetime in its vicinity. The Royal Society announced confirmation—accepted by physicists as the fall of Newton's theory. Yet few theoretical physicists believe general relativity is a fundamentally accurate description of gravitation, and instead seek a theory of quantum gravity.

== Total vs. partial holism ==
Some scholars, like Quine, argue that if a prediction that a theory makes comes out true, then the corresponding piece of evidence confirms the whole theory and even the whole framework within which that theory is embedded. Some have questioned this radical or total form of confirmational holism. If total holism were true, they argue, that would lead to absurd consequences like the confirmation of arbitrary conjunctions. For example, if the general theory of relativity is confirmed by the perihelion of Mercury then, according to total holism, the conjunction of the general theory of relativity with the claim that the moon is made of cheese also gets confirmed. More controversially, the two conjuncts are meant to be confirmed in equal measure.

The critics of total holism do not deny that evidence may spread its support far and wide. Rather, they deny that it always spreads its support to the whole of any theory or theoretical framework that entails or probabilistically predicts the evidence. This view is known as partial holism. One early advocate of partial confirmational holism is Adolf Grünbaum (1962). Another is Ken Gemes (1993). The latter provides refinements to the hypothetico-deductive account of confirmation, arguing that a piece of evidence may be confirmationally relevant only to some content parts of a hypothesis. A third critic is Elliott Sober (2004). He considers likelihood comparisons and model selection ideas. More recently, and in a similar vein, Ioannis Votsis (2014) argues for an objectivist account of confirmation, according to which, monstrous hypotheses, i.e. roughly hypotheses that are put together in an ad hoc or arbitrary way, have internal barriers that prevent the spread of confirmation between their parts. Thus even though the conjunction of the general theory of relativity with the claim that the moon is made of cheese gets confirmed by the perihelion of Mercury since the latter is entailed by the conjunction, the confirmation does not spread to the conjunct that the moon is made of cheese. In other words, it is not always the case that support spreads to all the parts of a hypotheses, and even when it does, it is not always the case that it spreads to the different parts in equal measure.

== See also ==
- Coherence theory of truth – Theory of truth based on coherence
- No true Scotsman – Logical fallacy
- Quine–Putnam indispensability argument – Argument in the philosophy of mathematics
- Semantic holism – Theory that meanings depend on their role within a larger linguistic context
- Theory-ladenness – Degree to which an observation is affected by one's presuppositions
- Truth theory
