= Cabrespine =

Commune in Occitanie, France

- Commune
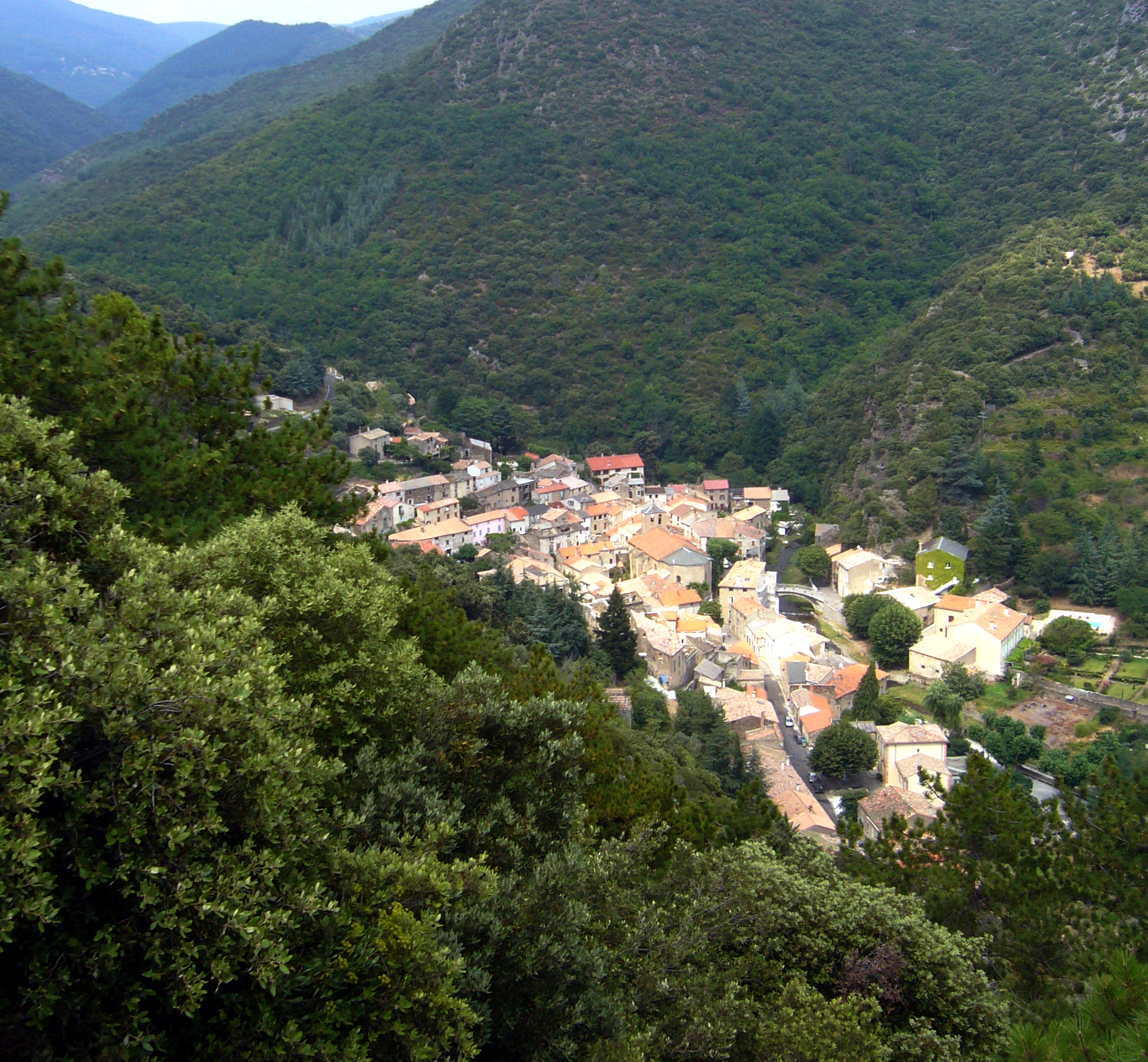
- A general view of Cabrespine

- Coat of arms
- Location of Cabrespine
- Location within France Location within Occitanie
- Coordinates: 43°21′50″N 2°27′38″E
- Country: France
- Region: Occitania
- Department: Aude
- Arrondissement: Carcassonne
- Canton: Le Haut-Minervois
- Intercommunality: Carcassonne Agglo

Government
  - Mayor (2020–2026): Philippe Clergue
- Area^{1}: 17.56 km^{2} (6.78 sq mi)
- Elevation: 309 m (1,014 ft)
- Highest elevation: 943 m (3,094 ft)
- Lowest elevation: 275 m (902 ft)
- Population (2023): 185
  - Density: 10.5/km^{2} (27.3/sq mi)
- Time zone: UTC+01:00 (CET)
  - Summer (DST): UTC+02:00 (CEST)
- INSEE/Postal code: 11056 /11160
- ^{1} French Land Register data, which excludes lakes, ponds, glaciers > 1 km^{2} (0.386 sq mi or 247 acres) and river estuaries.

Cabrespine (French pronunciation: [kabʁɛspin]; Occitan: Cabrespina) is a commune in the Aude department in southern France. Historically and culturally, the commune is part of the Montagne Noire, a mountain range forming the southern edge of the Massif Central. Subject to a Mediterranean climate, the area is drained by the Clamoux River, the Castanviels and Ourdivieille streams, and various other small watercourses. The commune boasts remarkable natural heritage: a Natura 2000 site (the Clamoux Gorges), a protected area (the Gaougnas Cave), a giant chasm (a cave notable for its immense size), and six natural zones of ecological, faunistic, and floristic interest.

Cabrespine is a rural commune with a population of 185 in 2023, down from a peak of 943 inhabitants in 1821. It falls within the catchment area of Carcassonne. Its residents are known as Cabrespinois (masculine) or Cabrespinoises (feminine).

== History ==
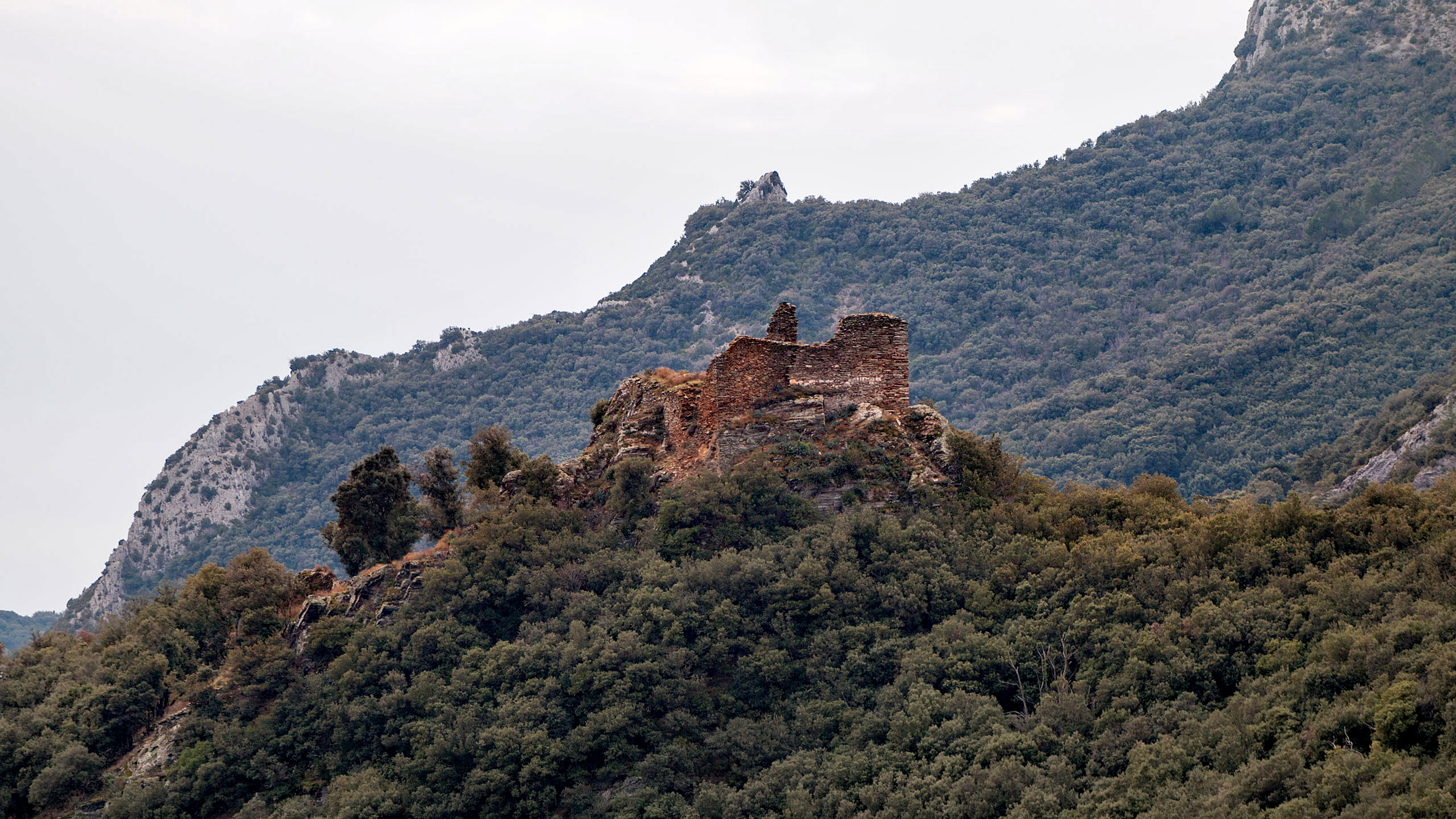
Cabrespine Castle.

During the Roman conquest, Cabrespine was served by secondary roads branching off the Via Domitia (a major Roman road), facilitating the operation of iron mines. These mines were long abandoned but later reopened in the 19th century; today, only tunnels and mine tailings remain.

In the Carolingian era, there were two churches: the Notre-Dame-de-la-Pitié chapel—adjacent to the current cemetery, of which only one wall remains—and the Church of Saint-Pierre. All that survives of the original Romanesque-style church is a white marble plaque carved in the Merovingian style; it is displayed in the current church, which was built on the same site in 1753.

Cabrespine—derived from Caput Spina ("thorn head")—belonged to the Abbey of Lagrasse from the time of Charlemagne until the French Revolution. A charter issued by Louis the Pious in 814 mentions the presence of a cella in Cabrespine; this was a monastic dependency designed to relieve congestion at the Lagrasse abbey and allow the few resident monks to oversee the estate's operations. Today, only a few increasingly faint ruins remain of it.

The castle—of which only a few ruins survive—dates back to 1035, during the Capetian era. Originally, it served as a royal garrison. In 1217, it was given to the Abbey of Lagrasse by Simon de Montfort as atonement for his sins. It reverted to the Crown around 1327; later, it was attacked by Huguenots and subsequently retaken by Catholics in 1584.

For a long time, the inhabitants of Cabrespine made their living from the land. Crops included vines, as well as chestnut and olive trees, rye, and potatoes. Sheep were also raised for their wool.

Of the three annual fairs, the one held on the first Monday of August—established by a royal decree in 1845—is a market for wool-bearing sheep and chestnut staves.

In the early 20th century, Cabrespine was a significant commune where many merchants and artisans prospered. The population had exceeded 850 in 1851, but industrialization and wars led to an inexorable decline. People left for the cities of lower Languedoc or for Mazamet. By the time of the First World War, only 600 inhabitants remained, and the figure continued to fall.

== Population ==
Historical population
Year	Pop.	±% p.a.
1968	190	—
1975	218	+1.98%
1982	192	−1.80%
1990	193	+0.06%
1999	196	+0.17%
2007	187	−0.59%
2012	170	−1.89%
2017	176	+0.70%
2023	185	+0.83%
Source: INSEE

== See also ==
- Communes of the Aude department
