= Duhem–Quine thesis =

Principle in the philosophy of science

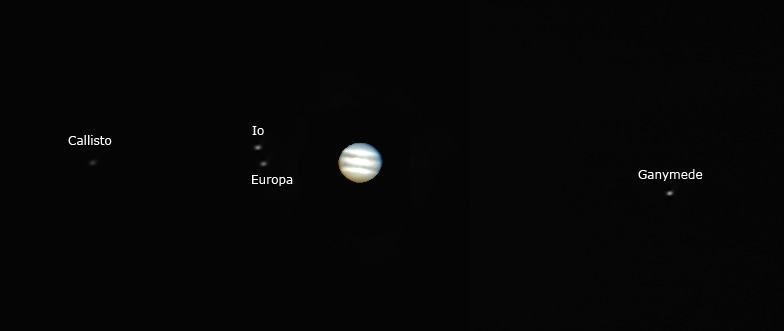
The four moons of Jupiter seen through a small telescope. Their observation by Galileo Galilei supported one bundle of hypotheses concerning the nature of the Solar System, which the papal authorities denied in favour of a different bundle.

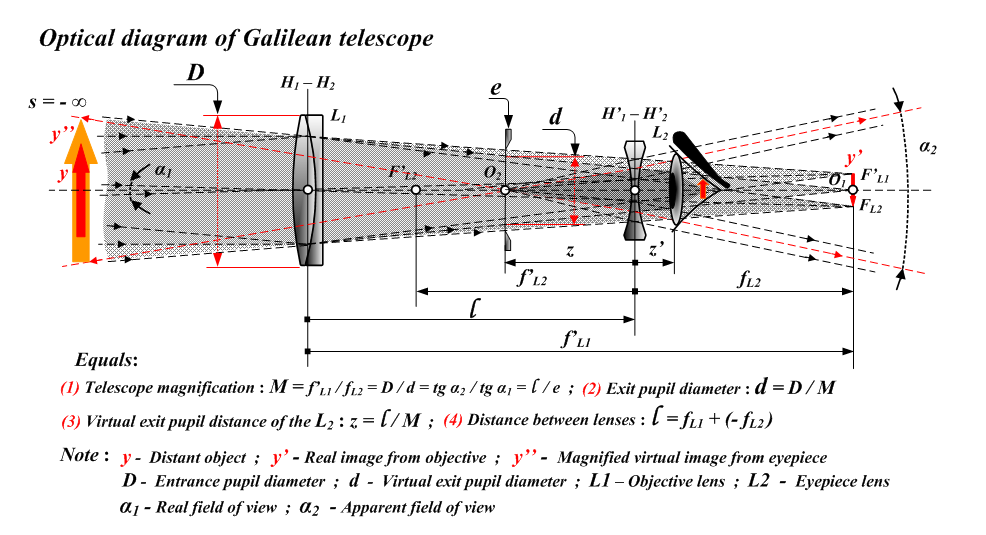
The geometrical optic functioning of the Galilean telescope does not lend itself to the creation of fictitious images. The following illustrations by Galileo accordingly refute one of the two alternative bundles of hypotheses.

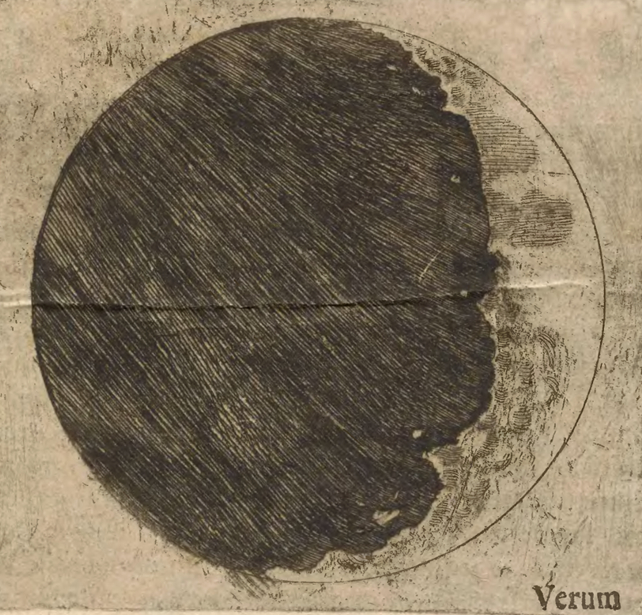
Galileo's sketch of mountains on the sickle Moon, as published in Sidereus Nuncius

In philosophy of science, the Duhem–Quine thesis, also called the Duhem–Quine problem, says that unambiguous falsifications of a scientific hypothesis are impossible, because an empirical test of the hypothesis requires one or more background assumptions. Rather than disproving the main hypothesis, the blame can be placed on one of the background beliefs or "auxiliary" hypotheses. It is named after French theoretical physicist Pierre Duhem and American logician Willard Van Orman Quine, who wrote about similar concepts.

In recent decades, the set of associated assumptions supporting a thesis sometimes is called a bundle of hypotheses, i.e. a hypothesis and its background assumptions. Although a bundle of hypotheses as a whole can be tested against the empirical world and be falsified if it fails the test, the Duhem–Quine thesis says it is impossible to isolate a single hypothesis in the bundle, a viewpoint called confirmation holism.

== Overview ==
The Duhem–Quine thesis argues that no scientific hypothesis is by itself capable of making predictions. Instead, deriving predictions from the hypothesis typically requires background assumptions that several other hypotheses are correct — that an experiment works as predicted, or that previous scientific theory is accurate. For instance, as evidence against the idea that the Earth is in motion, some people objected that birds did not get thrown off into the sky whenever they let go of a tree branch. Later theories of physics and astronomy, such as classical and relativistic mechanics could account for such observations without positing a fixed Earth, and in due course they replaced the static-Earth auxiliary hypotheses and initial conditions.

Although a bundle of hypotheses (i.e. a hypothesis and its background assumptions) as a whole can be tested against the empirical world and be falsified if it fails the test, the Duhem–Quine thesis says it is impossible to isolate a single hypothesis in the bundle. One solution to the dilemma thus facing scientists is that when we have rational reasons to accept the background assumptions as true (e.g. explanatory scientific theories together with their respective supporting evidence) we will have rational—albeit nonconclusive—reasons for thinking that the theory under test probably is wrong in at least one respect if the empirical test fails.

As Allan Franklin understands,

Consider the modus ponens. If a hypothesis h entails evidence e then not e entails not h. As Duhem and Quine, in slightly different ways, pointed out it is not h alone that entails e, but rather h and b, that entails e, where b is background knowledge. Thus, not e entails not h or not b, and one doesn’t know where to put the not. [sic]

== Example from Galilean astronomy ==
The work of Galileo Galilei in the application of the telescope to astronomical observation met with rejection from influential sceptics. They denied the truth of his most startling reports, such as that there were mountains on the Moon and satellites around Jupiter. In particular, some prominent philosophers, most notably Cesare Cremonini, refused to look through the telescope, arguing that the instrument itself might have introduced artefacts that produced the illusion of mountains or satellites invisible to the naked eye. To neglect such possibilities amounted to underdetermination in which argument for optical artefacts could be urged as being of equal merit to arguments for observation of new celestial effects. On a similar principle in modern times a prevalent view is that "extraordinary claims require extraordinary evidence".

In the early 17th century the modern version of the Duhem–Quine thesis had not been formulated, but common-sense objections to such elaborate and ad hoc implicit auxiliary assumptions were urged. To begin with, the mechanism of the (Galilean) telescopes had been explained in terms of geometrical optics, and the nature of the objects that they imaged was consistent; for example, a distant lake would not resemble a tree when seen through a telescope. The behaviour of telescopes on Earth denied any basis for arguing that they could create systematic artefacts in the sky, such as apparent satellites that behaved in the predictable manner of Jovian moons. Evidence also offered no basis to suggest that they could present yet other, more elaborate artefacts, fundamentally different from the satellites, such as lunar mountains that cast shadows varying consistently with the direction of solar illumination.

In practice the politics and theology of the day determined the result of the dispute, but the nature of the controversy was a clear example of how different bundles of (usually implicit) auxiliary assumptions could support mutually inconsistent hypotheses concerning a single theory. In terms of either version of the Duhem–Quine thesis, it therefore is necessary to study the defensibility of the auxiliary assumptions, together with the primary hypothesis, to arrive at the most viable working hypothesis.

== Pierre Duhem ==
As popular as the Duhem–Quine thesis may be in philosophy of science, in reality Pierre Duhem and Willard Van Orman Quine stated very different theses. Duhem believed that only in the field of physics can a single individual hypothesis not be isolated for testing. He says in no uncertain terms that experimental theory in physics is not the same as in fields like physiology and certain branches of chemistry. Also, Duhem's conception of "theoretical group" has its limits, since he states that not all concepts are connected to each other logically. He did not include at all a priori disciplines such as logic and mathematics within the theoretical groups in physics, since they cannot be tested.

== Willard Van Orman Quine ==
In "Two Dogmas of Empiricism", Quine presents a stronger form of underdetermination, extending it to all knowledge, even logic and mathematics. For Quine, knowledge constitutes a single web of empirical significance, making even the most abstract components epistemologically akin to mythological posits devised to explain experience. Even logic and mathematics might be revised in light of experience, he once held, citing quantum logic.

He later recanted, writing in Philosophy of Logic that revising logic would amount to "changing the subject". In classical logic, connectives are defined by truth values. In multi-valued logic or quantum logics, however, they diverge in meaning, with quantum logic abandoning truth-functional semantics altogether. Quine argued that deviant logics tend to lack the simplicity and fruitfulness of classic logic.

== See also ==
- Theory-ladenness
