= Theory-ladenness =

Degree to which an observation is affected by one's presuppositions

In philosophy of science, an observation is said to be "theory-laden" when shaped by the investigator's theoretical presuppositions. According to this perspective, observers may have a perspective that presupposes a theory, in which case they may make unnecessary judgments about information observed at the moment of observation. The thesis is chiefly associated with the late 1950s–early 1960s work of Norwood Russell Hanson, Thomas Kuhn, and Paul Feyerabend, though it was likely first put forth some 50 years earlier, at least implicitly, by Pierre Duhem.

Semantic theory-ladenness refers to the impact of theoretical assumptions on the meaning of observational terms, while perceptual theory-ladenness refers to their impact on the perceptual experience itself. Theory-ladenness is also relevant for measurement outcomes: the data thus acquired may be said to be theory-laden since it is meaningless by itself unless interpreted as the outcome of the measurement processes involved.

Theory-ladenness poses a problem for the confirmation of scientific theories since the observational evidence may already implicitly presuppose the thesis it is supposed to justify. This effect can present a challenge for reaching scientific consensus if the disagreeing parties make different observations due to their different theoretical backgrounds.

== Forms ==
Two forms of theory-ladenness should be kept separate: (a) The semantic form: the meaning of observational terms is partially determined by theoretical presuppositions; (b) The perceptual form: the theories held by the investigator, at a very basic cognitive level, impinge on the perceptions of the investigator. The former may be referred to as semantic and the latter as perceptual theory-ladenness.

In a book showing the theory-ladenness of psychiatric evidences, Massimiliano Aragona (Il mito dei fatti, 2009) distinguished three forms of theory-ladenness. The "weak form" was already affirmed by Karl Popper (it is weak because he maintains the idea of theoretical progress directed to the truth of scientific theories). The "strong" form was sustained by Kuhn and Feyerabend, with their notion of incommensurability.

However, Kuhn was a moderate relativist and maintained the Kantian view that although reality is not directly knowable, it manifests itself "resisting" to our interpretations. On the contrary, Feyerabend completely reversed the relationship between observations and theories, introducing an "extra-strong" form of theory-ladenness in which "anything goes".

== Measurement outcomes ==
Van Fraassen distinguishes between observations, phenomena (observed entities) and appearances (the contents of measurement outcomes). An example of an appearance is the temperature of 38°C of a patient as measured using a thermometer. The number "38" is meaningless by itself unless we interpret it as the outcome of a measurement process. Such an interpretation implicitly assumes various other theses about how the thermometer was used, how thermometers work etc. All appearances are theory-laden in this sense. But in many cases this does not pose serious practical problems as long as the presumed theses are either correct or only contain mistakes irrelevant to the intended application.

== Problem of confirmation ==
Theory-ladenness is particularly relevant for the problem of confirmation of scientific theories. According to the scientific method, observational evidence is needed to develop scientific theories and to test their predictions. But if an observation is theory-laden then it already implicitly presumes various theses and therefore cannot act as neutral arbitrator between theories which affirm (or deny) the presumed theses. This is akin to the informal fallacy of begging the question.

== Problem of scientific consensus ==
Theory-ladenness also poses problems for scientific consensus. Different researchers may initially hold different background beliefs. Ideally, the observations they make in the course of their research would enable each of them to discern which of these beliefs are false. So they would eventually reach an agreement on the central issues. But their different background beliefs may cause them to make different observations despite the fact that both observe the same phenomena. In such a case the disagreement happens not just on the level of the supported theories but also on the level of the supporting observational evidence that is supposed to arbitrate between the theories. Under those circumstances, gathering more theory-laden evidence would only deepen the problem instead of solving it.

The problem of unresolved disagreements is more severe in the social sciences and philosophy than in the natural sciences. For example, disagreements in ethics or in metaphysics often end in a clash of the brute intuitions which act as evidence for or against the competing theories. But it is an open question to which extent these disagreements are due to theory-ladenness or other factors.

== See also ==
- Confirmation holism
- Duhem–Quine thesis
- Observation
- Paradigm
- Metaphysics of presence
- Truthiness
