= Observational equivalence =

Semantic property

Observational equivalence is the property of two or more underlying entities being indistinguishable on the basis of their observable implications. Thus, for example, two scientific theories are observationally equivalent if all of their empirically testable predictions are identical, in which case empirical evidence cannot be used to distinguish which is closer to being correct; indeed, it may be that they are actually two different perspectives on one underlying theory.

In econometrics, two parameter values (or two structures, from among a class of statistical models) are considered observationally equivalent if they both result in the same probability distribution of observable data. This term often arises in relation to the identification problem.

In macroeconomics, it happens when you have multiple structural models, with different interpretation, but indistinguishable empirically. "the mapping between structural parameters and the objective function may not display a unique minimum."

In the formal semantics of programming languages, two terms M and N are observationally equivalent if and only if, in all contexts C[...] where C[M] is a valid term, it is the case that C[N] is also a valid term with the same value. Thus it is not possible, within the system, to distinguish between the two terms. This definition can be made precise only with respect to a particular calculus, one that comes with its own specific definitions of term, context, and the value of a term. The notion is due to James H. Morris, who called it "extensional equivalence."

== See also ==
- Underdetermination
