= Michael Williams (philosopher) =

British philosopher (born 1947)

- Born: 6 July 1947 (age 79)
- Spouse: Meredith Williams

Philosophical work
- Era: Contemporary philosophy
- Region: Western philosophy
- School: Analytic
- Main interests: Epistemology, Wittgenstein

Michael Williams (born 6 July 1947) is a British philosopher who is currently Krieger-Eisenhower Professor in the Department of Philosophy at Johns Hopkins University, noted especially for his work in epistemology.

== Biography ==
=== Early life and education ===
He received his BA from the University of Oxford and his PhD from Princeton University under the direction of Richard Rorty.

=== Professorship ===
He taught at Yale University, the University of Maryland, and Northwestern University prior to joining the faculty at Johns Hopkins.

In 2007, he was elected a Fellow of the American Academy of Arts and Sciences.

== Philosophy ==
=== Epistemology ===
Williams is best known as an epistemologist, but he also has significant interest in the philosophy of language, Wittgenstein, and the history of modern philosophy. Other scholars know him particularly for his work on philosophical skepticism. In his books (1992) and (2001), Williams performs what he calls a "theoretical diagnosis" of skepticism, according to which the soundness of skepticism presupposes a realist view of knowledge itself; that is, skepticism presupposes that knowledge is a context-invariant entity rather like a natural kind. By dispensing with this realist assumption that distinguishes the epistemological context from other contexts, the skeptical argument becomes unsound and can therefore be rejected. With this solution to the skeptical problem, Williams thereby defends a contextualist view of knowledge, but one that differs considerably from other contextualists such as Stewart Cohen and Keith DeRose. In addition to working on skepticism as a theoretical problem, Williams has a strong interest in the historical development of the skeptical tradition and defends the view that skeptical arguments in modern and contemporary philosophy differ in fundamental ways from similar or related arguments developed in antiquity.

Williams in his article entitled 'Why (Wittgensteinian) contextualism is not relativism' makes a distinction between Wittgenstein's contextualism and relativism. He argues that the first doctrine does not consider the agent's system of epistemic beliefs, whereas the latter considers it. The author postulates that the absolute justification in this system is refutable. He purposes to explain why the rejection of absolute justification does not raise objections to relativism. Considering that the set of epistemic beliefs are found in a system in a justified way, even if we suppose that this system of beliefs is coherent, one can have the problem of the circularity of justifications. Williams makes a distinction between inferential justification and non-inferential justification. He postulates that considering something in some way and seeing it that way are two different things. According to him, we can not confide in our epistemic beliefs unless they are justified independently of something else that we also believe. Therefore, our basic beliefs must be in an autonomous class of justified beliefs.

== Personal life ==
Williams is married to philosopher and Wittgenstein scholar Meredith Williams, a former member of the Johns Hopkins philosophy faculty who retired in 2017.

== Works ==
- Groundless Belief (1977)
- Unnatural Doubts (1992)
- Problems of Knowledge (2001)

== See also ==
- American philosophy
