= A Defence of Common Sense =

1925 essay by G. E. Moore

"A Defence of Common Sense" is a 1925 essay by philosopher G. E. Moore. In it, he attempts to refute absolute skepticism (or nihilism) by arguing that at least some of our established beliefs about the world are absolutely certain, so they can be legitimately called "facts". Moore argues that these beliefs are common sense.

== Summary ==
In section one, he argues that he has certain knowledge of a number of truisms, such as "My body has existed continuously on or near the earth, at various distances from or in contact with other existing things, including other living human beings", "I am a human being", and "My body existed yesterday".

In section two, he argues that there is a distinction between mental facts and physical facts. He says there is no good reason to believe, as many philosophers of his time did, that every physical fact is logically dependent on mental facts, or that every physical fact is causally dependent on mental facts. An example of a physical fact is "The mantelpiece is at present nearer to this body than that bookcase is". Mental facts include "I am conscious now" and "I am seeing something now".

In section three, he affirms that not only does he not think there are good reasons for believing that all material objects were created by God, but neither does common sense give reasons to think that God exists at all or that there is an afterlife.

The fourth section considers how common sense propositions like "Here is my hand" are to be analysed. Moore considers three possibilities that occur to him for how what we know in these cases are related to what we know about our sense-data, i.e. what he sees when looking at his hand. Moore concludes that we are absolutely certain about the common sense belief, but that no analysis of the propositions has been offered that is even close to being certain.

The fifth section is an examination of the problem of other minds, the idea that one can not be certain that other minds exist. Moore argues that "there are other 'selves'", but explains why this question has baffled philosophers. In other words, the sense data that he perceives through his senses are facts about the interaction of the external world and himself, but he (and other philosophers) do not know how to analyze these interactions.

== Influence ==
This paper, alongside Moore's "Proof of an External World", influenced the content of Ludwig Wittgenstein's On Certainty, which responded to a number claims made in both. Although somewhat critical of Moore's paper, he told him that it was his best one, to which Moore agreed.
