= Epistemic closure =

Principle in epistemology

Epistemic closure is a property of some belief systems and of many epistemic modal logics (viz. those which are "normal"). It is the principle that if a subject $S$ knows proposition $p$, and $S$ knows that $p$ implies $q$, then $S$ can thereby come to know $q$. Many epistemological theories involve a closure principle and many skeptical arguments assume a closure principle.

On the other hand, some epistemologists, including Robert Nozick, have denied closure principles on the basis of reliabilist accounts of knowledge. Nozick suggested a "truth tracking" theory of knowledge, according to which one knows $p$ only if one's belief in $p$ is "sensitive" to the truth or falsehood of $p$ in the relevant possibilities (modal scenarios). Specifically, sensitivity to a proposition amounts to meeting two counterfactual conditions: (1) if $p$ were false, then one would not believe $p$, and (2) if $p$ were true, then one would believe $p$. If knowledge must conform to the conditions for sensitivity, then epistemic closure fails because one can know p and that p implies q, whilst not being sensitive to the truth of q (and, therefore, not knowing q).

A subject may not actually believe q, for example, regardless of whether he or she is justified or warranted. Thus, one might instead say that knowledge is closed under known deduction: if, while knowing p, S believes q because S knows that p entails q, then S knows q. An even stronger formulation would be as such: If, while knowing various propositions, S believes p because S knows that these propositions entail p, then S knows p. While the principle of epistemic closure is generally regarded as intuitive, philosophers such as Robert Nozick and Fred Dretske have argued against it.

== Epistemic closure and skeptical arguments ==
The epistemic closure principle typically takes the form of a modus ponens argument:

1. S knows p.
2. S knows that p implies q.
3. Therefore, S knows q.

This epistemic closure principle is central to many versions of skeptical arguments. A skeptical argument of this type will involve knowledge of some piece of widely accepted information to be knowledge, which will then be pointed out to entail knowledge of some skeptical scenario, such as the brain in a vat scenario or the Cartesian evil demon scenario. A skeptic might say, for example, that if you know that you have hands, then you know that you are not a handless brain in a vat (because knowledge that you have hands implies that you know you are not handless, and if you know that you are not handless, then you know that you are not a handless brain in a vat). The skeptic will then utilize this conditional to form a modus tollens argument. For example, the skeptic might make an argument like the following:

1. You do not know that you are not a handless brain in a vat ($\neg K \neg h$)
2. If you know that you have hands, then you know that you are not a handless brain in a vat ($Ko \to K \neg h$)
3. Conclusion: Therefore, you do not know that you have hands ($\neg Ko$)

Much of the epistemological discussion surrounding this type of skeptical argument involves whether to accept or deny the conclusion, and how to do each. Ernest Sosa says that there are three possibilities in responding to the skeptic:

1. Agree with the skeptic by granting him both premises and the conclusion (1, 2, c)
2. Disagree with the skeptic by denying premise 2 and the conclusion, but maintaining premise 1 (1, ~2, ~c) as Nozick and Dretske do. This amounts to denying the epistemic closure principle.
3. Disagree with the skeptic by denying premise 1 and the conclusion, but maintaining premise 2 (~1, 2, ~c) as Moore does. This amounts to maintaining the epistemic closure principle, and holding that knowledge is closed under known implication.

== Justificatory closure ==
In the seminal 1963 paper, “Is Justified True Belief Knowledge?”, Edmund Gettier gave an assumption (later called the “principle of deducibility for justification” by Irving Thalberg, Jr.) that would serve as a basis for the rest of his piece: “for any proposition P, if S is justified in believing P and P entails Q, and S deduces Q from P and accepts Q as a result of this deduction, then S is justified in believing Q.” This was seized upon by Thalberg, who rejected the principle in order to demonstrate that one of Gettier's examples fails to support Gettier's main thesis that justified true belief is not knowledge (in the following quotation, (1) refers to “Jones will get the job”, (2) refers to “Jones has ten coins”, and (3) is the logical conjunction of (1) and (2)):

Why doesn't Gettier's principle (PDJ) hold in the evidential situation he has described? You multiply your risks of being wrong when you believe a conjunction. [… T]he most elementary theory of probability indicates that Smith's prospects of being right on both (1) and (2), namely, of being right on (3), are bound to be less favorable than his prospects of being right on either (1) or (2). In fact, Smith's chances of being right on (3) might not come up to the minimum standard of justification which (1) and (2) barely satisfy, and Smith would be unjustified in accepting (3). (Thalberg 1969, p. 798)

== In other uses ==
=== Epistemic closure in U.S. political discussion ===
The term "epistemic closure" has been used in an unrelated sense in American political debate to refer to the claim that political belief systems can be closed systems of deduction, unaffected by empirical evidence. This use of the term was popularized by libertarian blogger and commentator Julian Sanchez in 2010 as an extreme form of confirmation bias.

== See also ==
- Epistemic logic
- Doxastic logic
- Here is one hand#Objections and replies – Epistemological argument by George Edward Moore
