= Relevant alternatives theory =

Relevant alternatives theory (RAT) is an epistemological theory of knowledge, according to which to know some proposition p one must be able to rule out all relevant alternatives to p.

== Introduction ==
Relevant alternatives theory was primarily developed by Fred Dretske. It states that "knowing a true proposition one believes at a time requires being able to rule out relevant alternatives to that proposition at that time." One way that Dretske attempts to motivate RAT is with examples, such as the following:

You take your son to the zoo, see several zebras, and, when questioned by your son, tell him they are zebras. Do you know they are zebras? Well, most of us would have little hesitation saying that we did know this. We know what zebras look like, and, besides, this is the city zoo and the animals are in a pen clearly marked "Zebras." Yet, something's being a zebra implies that it is not a mule and, in particular, not a mule cleverly disguised by the zoo authorities to look like a zebra. Do you know that these animals are not mules cleverly disguised by the zoo authorities to look like zebras?

The relevant alternatives theorist claims that one does know that they are zebras, provided that any relevant alternatives (e.g. that they are lions, that they are mules, etc.) can be ruled out and any other alternatives (e.g. the possibility of the zoo authorities cleverly disguising mules to look like zebras) are not relevant in the context in which knowledge is being attributed. The important question, however, is: What makes an alternative relevant?

== Relation to contextualism ==
Jason Stanley has argued that Dretske's relevant alternative theory was the starting point for the development of contextualism in epistemology, specifically with the subsequent work done by Alvin Goldman and Gail Stine.

== See also ==
- Contextualism
- Epistemology

== References and further reading ==
- DeRose, Keith. 1992. "Contextualism and Knowledge Attributions", Philosophy and Phenomenological Research, 52, pp. 913–929.
- Dretske, Fred. 1970. "Epistemic Operators", The Journal of Philosophy, 67, pp. 1007–23.
- Dretske, Fred. 1981. Knowledge and the Flow of Information, Oxford: Blackwell.
- Stanley, Jason. 2005. Knowledge and Practical Interests. New York: Oxford University Press.
