= Gail Stine =

American philosopher

Gail Stine (nee Caldwell, 1940–December 28, 1977) was an American philosopher who specialized in epistemology and philosophy of language. She was born in Schenectady, New York.

Before her death at the age of 37, she was a professor of philosophy at Wayne State University. Wayne State now holds the annual Gail Stine Memorial Lecture in her honor. Mount Holyoke College holds an annual Gail Stine Lecture in her honor.

== Education ==
Stine graduated from Mount Holyoke College in 1962. Stine was a student of W. V. O. Quine and received her PhD at Harvard University in 1969 under the supervision of Burton Dreben.

== Work ==
Stine was an advocate of contextualism, the view that the truth-value of knowledge claims is context dependent. Stine also advocates the view that for a subject to know that p, she must rule out all relevant alternatives to p, a position also held by Alvin Goldman and Fred Dretske. Probably her most well-known article is her 1976 Philosophical Studies article, "Skepticism, Relevant Alternatives, and Deductive Closure".
