= Julian Sanchez (writer) =

American writer (born 1979)

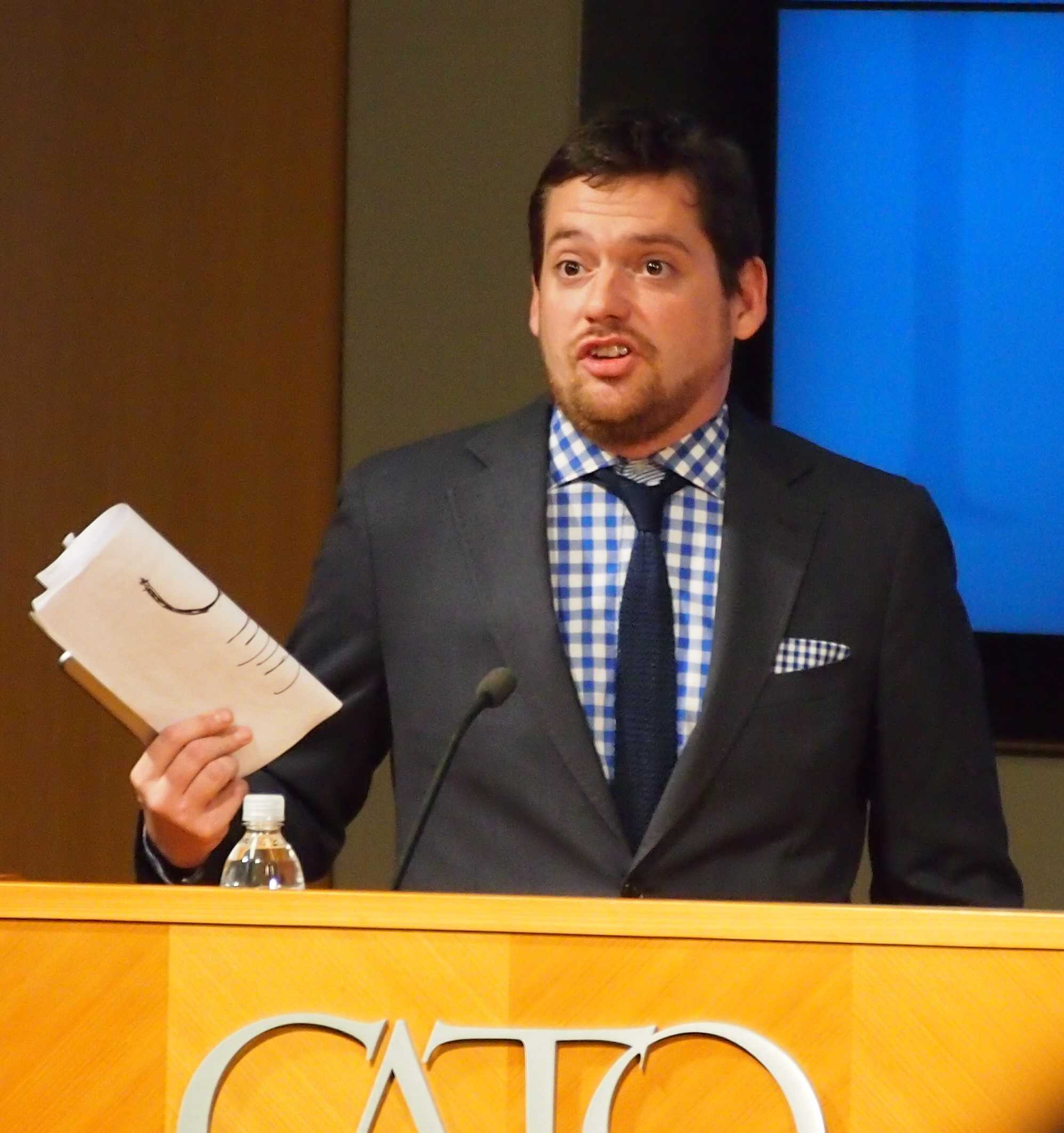
- Born: Miguel Julian Sanchez; March 14, 1979 (age 47); New Jersey, U.S.
- Education: New York University
- Occupations: Journalist, blogger
- Notable credit(s): Senior Fellow at the Cato Institute; editor at Reason magazine; has guest blogged for Andrew Sullivan; frequent guest on BloggingHeads.tv
- Website: http://www.juliansanchez.com

Julian Sanchez (born March 14, 1979) is an American writer living in Washington, D.C. Formerly a senior fellow at the Cato Institute, he previously covered technology and privacy issues as the Washington editor for Ars Technica.

== Life ==
He first came to public attention in 2003 when he helped to expose gun control critic John Lott for defending himself in online forums using an assumed identity. Soon afterwards, Sanchez was hired as an assistant editor at Reason magazine, where he is now a contributing editor.

Sanchez was raised in Norwood in Bergen County, New Jersey, where he attended public school.

Sanchez has a weblog on his personal website. He has also blogged for Reason and The Economist. In the winter of 2005–06, Andrew Sullivan asked Sanchez and Ross Douthat to guest blog on his widely read weblog, The Daily Dish. Sanchez's work has been cited in blogs such as The Volokh Conspiracy, Marginal Revolution, and Instapundit. In a 2010 blog post he adapted the philosophical term epistemic closure to describe the effect that the rise of conservative media has had on right-of-center political discourse in the United States. His analysis sparked a spirited debate among conservative pundits that was eventually covered by The New York Times.

Sanchez is a graduate of New York University, where he studied philosophy and political science.
