= Here is one hand =

Epistemological argument by George Edward Moore

Here is one hand, here is another hand is an epistemological argument formulated by G. E. Moore against philosophical skepticism about the external world and in support of common sense.

The argument takes the following form:

- Here is one hand,
- And here is another.
- There are at least two external objects in the world.
- Therefore, an external world exists.

== Introduction ==
G. E. Moore wrote "A Defence of Common Sense" and Proof of an External World. For the purposes of these essays, he posed skeptical hypotheses, such as that according to which we are disembodied souls living in an immaterial world with the mere hallucination of ordinary things induced by a Cartesian evil demon, and then provided his own response to them. Such hypotheses ostensibly create a situation where it seems that it is not possible to know that anything in the world exists. To reach this conclusion, the skeptic uses arguments with the following form.

=== The skeptical argument ===
Where S is a subject, sk is a skeptical possibility, such as the evil demon hypothesis or the more recent brain in a vat hypothesis, and q is any fact that supposedly exists in the world (e.g. the fact that there are trees and mountains):

- If S knows that q, then S knows that not-sk.
- S doesn't know that not-sk.
- Therefore, S doesn't know that q.

=== Moore's response ===
Moore does not attack the first premise of the skeptic's argument, but denies its conclusion and uses this negation as the second premises of his own argument. So, Moore reverses the argument from being in the form of modus tollens to modus ponens. This logical maneuver is often called a G. E. Moore shift or a Moorean shift. This is captured clearly in Fred Dretske's aphorism that "one man's modus ponens is another man's modus tollens". His response takes the following form:

- If S knows that q, then S knows that not-sk.
- S knows that q.
- Therefore, S knows that not-sk.

== Explanation ==
Moore put the point into dramatic relief with his 1939 essay Proof of an External World, in which he gave a common sense argument against skepticism by raising his right hand and saying "here is one hand", and then raising his left and saying "and here is another". Here, Moore is taking his knowledge claim (I know that q) to be that he knows that (q) there are two hands, where these hands are external, that is to say, material. Without rejecting the skeptic's first premise, Moore seeks to prove that he can know that the skeptical possibility sk is false. Here, sk stands for "I'm a disembodied soul living in an immaterial world". If there is an external world made by at least two hands, sk is false.

Moore's argument is not simply a flippant response to the skeptic. Moore gives, in Proof of an External World, three requirements for a good proof: (1) the premises must be different from the conclusion, (2) the premises must be known, and (3) the conclusion must follow from the premises. He claims that his proof of an external world meets those three criteria.

In his 1925 essay "A Defence of Common Sense", Moore argues against skepticism toward the external world (and idealism) on the grounds that the skeptic could not give reasons to accept the premise that we don't know that we aren't in a sceptical scenario (S doesn't know that not-sk) that are stronger than the reasons we have to accept common sense claims such as that we know that there are hands (S knows that q), when we see them. In other words, Moore thinks it is more reasonable to believe that we have hands when we see them than to believe the alternative premise of what he deems "a strange argument in a university classroom".

== Objections and replies ==
Some subsequent philosophers (especially those inclined to skeptical doubts) have found Moore's method of argument unconvincing.

One form of refutation contends that Moore's attempted proof fails his second criterion for a good proof (i.e. the premises are not known) by pointing out the difference between demonstrating the perception that his hands exist and demonstrating the knowledge that his hands exist. Moore may be doing the former when he means to be doing the latter.

Another form of refutation simply points out that not everyone shares Moore's intuition. If a person finds the skeptical possibility sp more intuitively likely than the knowledge claim q, then for that person Moore's own defense of intuition provides a basis for their skepticism.

=== Ludwig Wittgenstein ===
Appeals of this type are subsequently often called "Moorean facts". "A Moorean fact [is] one of those things that we know better than we know the premises of any philosophical argument to the contrary".

Moore's claim to know such facts had "long interested" Ludwig Wittgenstein. His last writings in the six weeks before his death in 1951 were an attempt to respond comprehensively to Moore's argument, the fourth time in two years he had tried to do so. His notes from the four periods were collected and translated by his literary executors and published posthumously as On Certainty in 1969.

Wittgenstein offers a subtle objection to Moore's argument in passage #554 of On Certainty. Considering "I know", he says "In its language-game it is not presumptuous ('nicht anmassend')," so that even if P implies Q, knowing P is true doesn't necessarily entail knowing Q. Moore has displaced "I know..." from its language-game and derived a fallacy.

== Dispute over transmission of justification ==
The discussion of Moore's controversial proof has given rise to an important dispute over its interpretation and evaluation, with Crispin Wright and James Pryor as its main protagonists. Wright has famously argued that Moore's proof is subtly circular so that it cannot provide justification for believing its conclusion. Wright schematises Moore's proof as follows:

- (H) This is a hand.
- (W) There is an external world (i.e. something material).

Here, Moore's evidence for H is his visual experience of a hand. Wright acknowledges that H entails W (if there is a material hand, there is something material). However, Wright argues that H can be justified by Moore's experience only if Moore has independent justification for believing W. Because of this – Wright argues – the justification for H fails to transmit to W.

To see what Wright has in mind, consider this different argument that – Wright contends – does not transmit justification in the same sense. Suppose that Jessica and Jocelyn are indistinguishable twins, and suppose that John tries to use the following argument to conclude that the girl in front of him is not Jocelyn.

- (J) This girl is Jessica.
- (N) This girl is not Jocelyn.

Here, J entails N. However, imagine that John's evidence for J is the fact that the girl before him resembles Jessica. Clearly, this evidence can justify J for John only if he already has justification for believing that the girl is not Jocelyn (Jessica's indistinguishable twin). Given this, John cannot use the above argument to come to justifiably believe N. Wright claims that arguments like this do not transmit justification.

Wright insists that what happens in Moore's proof is analogous: Moore can get justification for believing H from his appearance of a hand only if he has antecedent justification for believing W. Thus, Moore cannot come to justifiably believe W through his proof. In short, Moore's proof is not transmissive.

Pryor disagrees because he thinks that Moore's proof is transmissive. According to Pryor's classification, Wright's epistemology of perception is conservative. According to perceptual conservatism, when an agent S has an experience as if P (where P is any proposition), S can have (fallible) justification for believing P only if S has independent justification for ruling out all relevant error hypotheses (e.g. the hypothesis that S's experience is a mere hallucination).

The main problem with conservatism is that it may lead us to skepticism. In other words, conservatives must explain where our independent justification for ruling out error hypotheses comes from in general, which appears to be very hard. (To answer this question, Wright, for example, has advanced his controversial theory of epistemic entitlement.)

Pryor rejects conservatism and embraces a form of liberalism about perception that he calls "perceptual dogmatism." According to perceptual dogmatism, if S has an experience as if P, S has immediate (fallible) justification for believing P. Immediate justification for P is a justification that does not rest on independent justification for believing anything else.

According to perceptual dogmatism, Moore does not need an independent justification for believing W, when he has an experience as if H, in order to obtain justification for believing H. Therefore, within this theoretical framework, Moore's proof is transmissive: Moore can obtain justification for W through his argument.

Pryor acknowledges that Moore's proof seems "odd," but suggests that its problem is not epistemic but dialectical: the proof produces a justification for the conclusion, yet it will not convince the obstinate skeptic who already doubts the conclusion before examining the proof. Since the skeptic doubts that there is an external world, she will not accept her experience as if there is a hand as justification for believing that there is a (material) hand. Thus, the skeptic will not be convinced by Moore's proof.

Luca Moretti has recently proposed an alternative interpretation of the apparent "oddness" of Moore's proof. According to Moretti, who accepts a form of liberalism, since Moore has an experience that there is a hand – precisely, a material hand – Moore will directly obtain from that experience a justification for believing both H and W – that is, that there is a hand and something material. Hence, Moore does not need to reason through the argument to obtain a justification for W. Thus, Moore's proof is strange because it is actually useless if one seeks justification for believing that the external word exists.

== See also ==
- Samuel Johnson, who is said to have kicked a rock on learning of Bishop Berkeley's denial of matter, declaring "I refute it thus!"
- Diogenes, who is said to have walked away upon hearing a philosophical argument denying the existence of motion, intending to prove without utterance that motion does indeed exist.
- In Leo Tolstoy's War and Peace, determinism is refuted as: “You say: I am not free. But I have raised and lowered my arm. Everyone understands that this illogical answer is an irrefutable proof of freedom.”
- Nonsense § Disguised Epistemic Nonsense for an interpretation of Wittgenstein's response to Moore.
