= Carol Hay =

Canadian philosopher

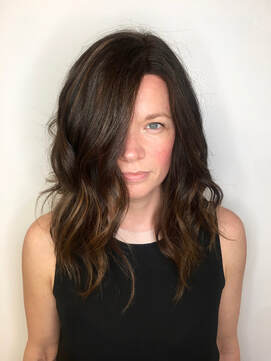
- Awards: APA's Op-Ed Prize; Gregory Kavka/UCI Prize

Education
- Education: Ohio State University (PhD)
- Thesis: Rationality and Oppression: A Defence of the Obligation to Resist Oppression (2008)
- Doctoral advisor: Timothy Schroeder
- Other advisors: Louise Antony; Sigrun Svavarsdottir; Richard J. Samuels

Philosophical work
- Era: 21st-century philosophy
- Region: Western philosophy
- Institutions: University of Massachusetts Lowell
- Main interests: feminist theory, moral philosophy
- Website: https://www.carolhay.org/

Carol Hay is a Canadian philosopher and philosophy professor at the University of Massachusetts Lowell. She is known for her work in feminist theory and moral philosophy.

== Career ==
Hay's most recent book, Think Like a Feminist: The Philosophy Behind the Revolution (W.W. Norton & Co., 2020), was called "a crisp, well-informed primer on feminist theory" by Publishers Weekly and "a winning mix of scholarship and irreverence" by Kirkus Reviews. Her academic work focuses primarily on issues in analytic feminism, liberal social and political philosophy, oppression studies, Kantian ethics, and the philosophy of sex and love. Her 2013 book Kantianism, Liberalism, & Feminism: Resisting Oppression received the American Philosophical Association's Gregory Kavka/UCI Prize in Political Philosophy in 2015. Her 2019 op-ed "Who Counts as a Woman?" received the American Philosophical Association's Public Philosophy Op-Ed Prize. Hay's public philosophy has appeared in venues such as The New York Times, The Boston Globe, Aeon, and IAI News.

== Works ==
- (2020). Think Like a Feminist: The Philosophy Behind the Revolution. W.W. Norton
- (2018). Gross Violations. Rowman & Littlefield
- (2018). Resisting Oppression Revisited. Bloomsbury
- (2017). Macmillan Interdisciplinary Handbooks: Feminist Philosophy. Macmillan Reference USA, a part of Gale, Cengage Learning
- (2016). Philosophy of Feminism. Macmillan Reference USA, a part of Gale, Cengage Learning
- (2013). Kantianism, Liberalism, and Feminism: Resisting Oppression. Palgrave Macmillan
