= Timothy Schroeder =

American philosopher

Education
- Education: Stanford University (PhD); University of Lethbridge (BA)
- Thesis: Foundations of mental representation (1998)
- Doctoral advisor: Fred Dretske
- Other advisors: John Perry, Ken Taylor, Peter Godfrey-Smith

Philosophical work
- Era: 21st-century philosophy
- Region: Western philosophy
- Institutions: Rice University
- Doctoral students: Carol Hay
- Main interests: Moral psychology, philosophy of mind, desire, addiction, consciousness

Timothy Schroeder is an American philosopher and Professor of Philosophy at Rice University. He is known for his works on nature of desire.

He is not to be confused with the English art historian Timothy Schroder, a silver specialist.

== Books ==
- To Act, forthcoming
- In Praise of Desire, with N. Arpaly, Oxford University Press 2014
- Three Faces of Desire, Oxford University Press 2004
