= Radical skepticism =

Philosophical position that knowledge is most likely impossible

Radical skepticism (or radical scepticism in British English) is the philosophical position that knowledge is impossible. Radical skeptics hold that doubt exists as to the veracity of every belief and that certainty is therefore never justified. To determine the extent to which it is possible to respond to radical skeptical challenges is the task of epistemology and "the theory of knowledge".

== See also ==
- Pyrrhonism
- Cratylism
- Epistemological nihilism
- Nihilism
- Skepticism
- Ajñana
