= On Certainty =

Book by Ludwig Wittgenstein

- First edition
- Author: Ludwig Wittgenstein
- Translator: Denis Paul and G. E. M. Anscombe
- Language: German and English
- Subject: Ordinary Language Philosophy, Skepticism and Certainty
- Publisher: Basil Blackwell
- Publication date: 1969
- Publication place: England
- Media type: Book
- Pages: 90
- ISBN: 0631120009
- OCLC: 799287983
- LC Class: 69-20428

On Certainty (German: Über Gewissheit, original spelling Über Gewißheit) is a philosophical book composed from notes written by Ludwig Wittgenstein over four separate periods in the eighteen months before his death on 29 April 1951. He left his initial notes at the home of Elizabeth Anscombe, who linked them by theme with later passages in Wittgenstein's personal notebooks and (with G. H. von Wright), compiled them into a German/English parallel text book published in 1969. The translators were Denis Paul and Anscombe herself. (The editors also numbered and grouped the 676 passages; citations to the work are standardly given as OC1 through OC676 rather than by page number.)

The book's concerns are largely epistemological, a recurrent theme being that there are some things which must be exempt from doubt in order for human practices to be possible, including the activity of raising doubts: "A doubt that doubted everything would not be a doubt" (OC450). The book takes as its starting point the 'here is one hand' argument made by G. E. Moore and examines the role of knowledge claims in human language, particularly of "certain ('gewisser') empirical propositions", what are now called Moorean propositions or Moorean certainties.

An important outcome is Wittgenstein's claim that all doubt is enmeshed in belief and therefore the most radical forms of doubt must be rejected since they form a contradiction within the system that expressed them: "If you tried to doubt everything you would not get as far as doubting anything. The game of doubting itself presupposes certainty" (OC115). Wittgenstein also sketched (then-)novel refutations of philosophical skepticism in various guises: "If you are not certain of any fact, you cannot be certain of the meaning of your words either" (OC114); "If the true is what is grounded, then the ground is not true, not yet false" (OC205). Another recurrent motif (OC111,448,654), one that arguably unlocks the text for the lay reader, concerns the futility of endlessly re-checking an arithmetical calculation (OC77): what, precisely, is being re-checked? The calculation itself? Or, rather, the sanity, sobriety, and comprehension (say), of the re-checker? (See: Linguistic turn.) But (OC658): are not the sanity, sobriety, and comprehension of the re-checker presupposed by the very activity of, validly, checking and re-checking? "Giving grounds, however - justifying the evidence - comes to an end. But the end is not certain propositions' striking us immediately as true, i.e. it is not a kind of seeing on our part; it is our acting which lies at the bottom of the language-game" (OC204).

== Gestation ==
The genesis of On Certainty was Wittgenstein's "long interest" in two famous papers by G. E. Moore, his 1939 Proof of the External World and earlier Defence of Common Sense (1925). Wittgenstein thought the latter was Moore's "best article", but despite that he did not think Moore's 'proof' of external reality decisive. Apparently at the instigation of his close friend Norman Malcolm in mid-1949, Wittgenstein began to draft his response on loose sheets, probably while staying in Vienna in late 1949 and early 1950. He returned to the subject twice more before a fourth and final, highly energetic six week period immediately before his death, when more than half of On Certainty was written. By this time Wittgenstein was using notebooks, recording dates, and marking the topic off separately. Wittgenstein described this final, fertile period in his last letter to Norman Malcolm dated 16 April 1951, thirteen days before his death from the cancer diagnosed in autumn 1949:

"An extraordinary thing has happened to me. About a month ago I suddenly found myself in the right frame of mind for doing philosophy. I had been absolutely certain that I'd never again be able to do it. It's the first time after more than 2 years that the curtain in my brain has gone up. -Of course, so far I've only worked for about 5 weeks & it may be all over by tomorrow, but it bucks me up a lot now."

Nevertheless, on the same day he recorded (after OC532): "I do philosophy now like an old woman who is always mislaying something and having to look for it again: now her spectacles, now her keys." A week and a half earlier he had written a similar note before OC471: "Here there is still a big gap in my thinking. And I doubt whether it will be filled now."

In addition, Wittgenstein was inspired by John Henry Newman's study on the nature of belief in the Grammar of Assent. Oxford philosopher Anthony Kenny writes that Ludwig Wittgenstein's final notes on philosophy just before his death mention Newman and that On Certainty "covers many of the same topics as the Grammar of Assent, uses many of the same illustrations, and draws some of the same conclusions".

== The text as published ==
The four parts of On Certainty are of fairly unequal length and only the last is systematically dated:

1. OC1..OC65 - probably all before end of March 1950
2. OC66..OC192 - of entirely unknown date
3. OC193..OC299 - uncertain, but OC287 is dated 23.9.50 and might apply onward
4. OC300..OC676 - dates begin at 10.3.51 and run to 27.4.51 (OC670)

== See also ==
- "Here is one hand"
- Nonsense#Disguised Epistemic Nonsense
- Philosophical Investigations
- Philosophical skepticism
