= Local skepticism =

View that one cannot possess knowledge in some particular domain

Local skepticism is the view that one cannot possess knowledge in some particular domain. It contrasts with global skepticism (also known as absolute skepticism or universal skepticism), the view that one cannot know anything at all.

== Examples of local skepticism ==
- Moral skepticism is the belief that moral knowledge is either nonexistent or unattainable.
- Metaphysical skepticism, often called external world skepticism, is the denial of metaphysical knowledge. This belief is generally said to follow from the argument that material knowledge can only be attained through our perception of the world, and that our senses which constitute that perception do not necessarily correspond with any actual state of affairs. See also: subjective idealism.
- Theological skepticism it is the view that we cannot know for certain whether one or more deities exist. A theological skeptic may be an atheist, theist, or agnostic.
