= Keith DeRose =

American philosopher (born 1962)

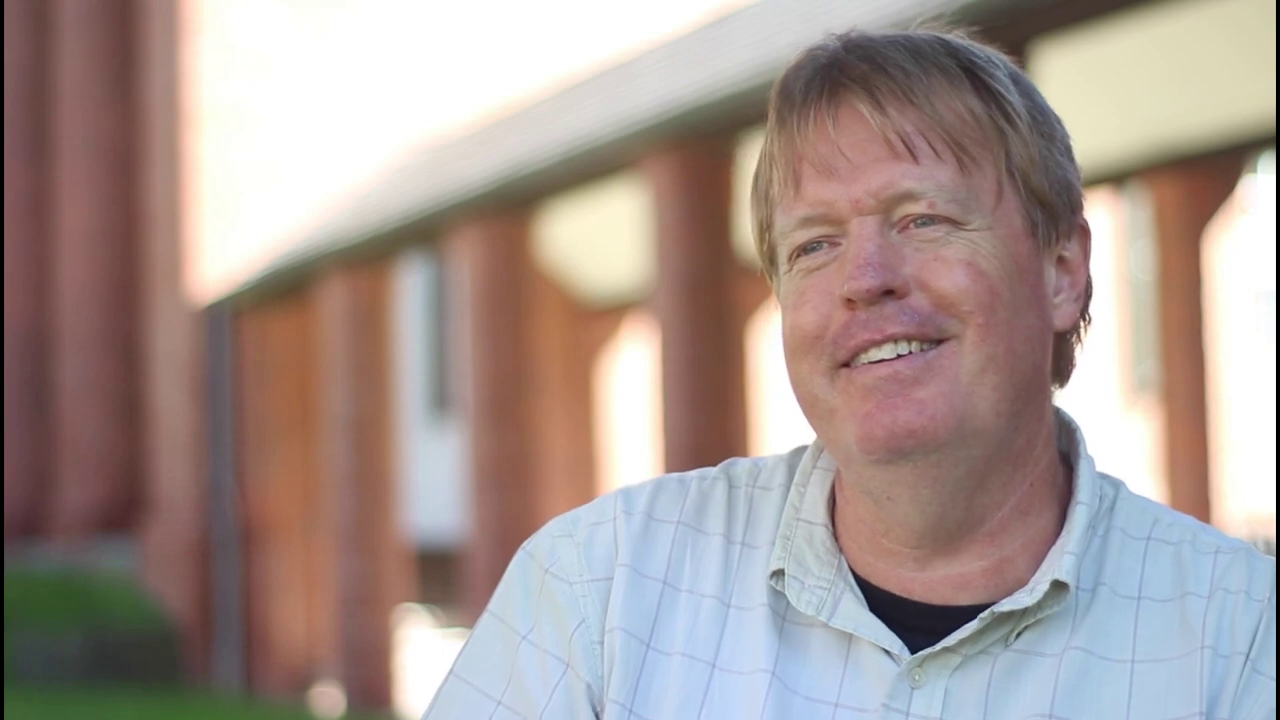

Keith DeRose (born April 24, 1962) is an American philosopher teaching at Yale University in New Haven, Connecticut, where he is currently Allison Foundation Professor of Philosophy. He taught previously at New York University and Rice University. His primary interests include epistemology, philosophy of language, philosophy of religion, and history of modern philosophy. He is best known for his work on contextualism in epistemology, especially as a response to the traditional problem of skepticism.

== Education ==
DeRose graduated from Calvin College in 1984 with a B.A. in Philosophy. He then studied at UCLA, earning an M.A. in 1986 and a PhD in 1990; his dissertation was entitled Knowledge, Epistemic Possibility, and Skepticism, under Rogers Albritton. While at UCLA, he won the Robert M. Yost Prize for Excellence in Teaching (1988), was awarded the Griffin Fellowship in 1990, and won the Carnap Essay Prize in 1989 and again in 1990.

== Philosophical work ==
DeRose is a proponent of contextualism in epistemology, the view that "what is expressed by a knowledge attribution — a claim to the effect that S “knows” that p — depends partly on something in the context of the attributor, and hence the view is often called ‘attributor contextualism’. Because such an utterance is context-dependent, so too is whether the attribution is true. The typical [contextualist] view identifies the pivotal contextual features as the attributor’s practical stake in the truth of p, or the prominence in the attributor’s situation of skeptical doubts about knowledge." DeRose is best-known for his application of contextualism to skepticism.

== Selected publications ==
- The Case for Contextualism. Knowledge, Skepticism, and Context, Oxford University Press, 2009.
- "The Ordinary Language Basis for Contextualism and the New Invariantism," The Philosophical Quarterly, 2005.
- "Direct Warrant Realism," in A. Dole and A. Chignell, ed., God and the Ethics of Belief: New Essays in Philosophy of Religion (Cambridge University Press, 2005).
- "Single Scoreboard Semantics," Philosophical Studies, 2004.
- "Assertion, Knowledge, and Context," Philosophical Review, 2002; Philosopher's Annual, vol. 26.
- "Solving the Skeptical Problem," Philosophical Review, 1995; Philosopher's Annual, vol. 18.
- "Contextualism and Knowledge Attributions," Philosophy and Phenomenological Research, 1992
- "Epistemic Possibilities," Philosophical Review, 1991.
- "Reid's Anti-Sensationalism and His Realism," Philosophical Review, 1989.

== See also ==
- American philosophy
- List of American philosophers
