= Kaktovik (disambiguation) =

Kaktovik is a city in Alaska, United States.

Kaktovik may also refer to:

- Kaktovik numerals, an Inuit numeral system for a base-20 counting system
- Kaktovik Numerals (Unicode block), a Unicode character block
- Kaktovik Village, an Alaska Native tribal entity recognized by the US government
