= Folk mathematics =

Folk mathematics may refer to:

- The mathematical folklore that circulates among mathematicians
- The informal mathematics used in everyday life

== See also ==
- Folk theorem (disambiguation)
