= Kaktovik numerals =

Inuit numeral system for a base-20 counting system

The 20 digits of the Kaktovik system

The Kaktovik numerals or Kaktovik Iñupiaq numerals are a base-20 system of numerical digits created by Alaskan Iñupiat. They are visually iconic, with shapes that indicate the number being represented.

The Iñupiaq language has a base-20 numeral system, as do the other Eskimo–Aleut languages of Alaska and Canada (and formerly Greenland). Arabic numerals, which were designed for a base-10 system, are inadequate for Iñupiaq and other Inuit languages. To remedy this problem, students in Kaktovik, Alaska, invented a base-20 numeral notation in 1994, which has spread among the Alaskan Iñupiat and has been considered for use in Canada.

== System ==
Iñupiaq, like other Inuit languages, has a base-20 counting system with a sub-base of 5 (a quinary-vigesimal system). That is, quantities are counted in scores (as in Welsh and French quatre-vingts 'eighty'), with intermediate numerals for 5, 10, and 15. Thus 78 is identified as three score fifteen-three.

The Kaktovik digits graphically reflect the lexical structure of the Iñupiaq numbering system.

The twenty digits
0	𝋀	kisitchisaġvik	5	𝋅	tallimat	10	𝋊	qulit	15	𝋏	akimiaq
1	𝋁	atausiq	6	𝋆	itchaksrat	11	𝋋	qulit atausiq	16	𝋐	akimiaq atausiq
2	𝋂	malġuk	7	𝋇	tallimat malġuk	12	𝋌	qulit malġuk	17	𝋑	akimiaq malġuk
3	𝋃	piŋasut	8	𝋈	tallimat piŋasut	13	𝋍	qulit piŋasut	18	𝋒	akimiaq piŋasut
4	𝋄	sisamat	9	𝋉	quliŋŋuġutaiḷaq	14	𝋎	akimiaġutaiḷaq	19	𝋓	iñuiññaġutaiḷaq

Larger numbers are composed of these digits in a positional notation:

Decimal	Vigesimal	
Arabic	Arabic	Kaktovik
20	10_{20}	𝋁 𝋀
40	20_{20}	𝋂 𝋀
400	100_{20}	𝋁 𝋀
800	200_{20}	𝋂 𝋀

=== Values ===
In the following table are the decimal values of the Kaktovik digits up to three places to the left and to the right of the units' place.

Decimal values of Kaktovik numbers
n	n × 20^{3}	n × 20^{2}	n × 20^{1}	n × 20^{0}	n × 20^{−1}	n × 20^{−2}	n × 20^{−3}
1	, 8,000	400	20	1	. 0.05	. 0.0025	. 0.000125
2	, 16,000	800	40	2	. 0.1	. 0.005	. 0.00025
3	, 24,000	1,200	60	3	. 0.15	. 0.0075	. 0.000375
4	, 32,000	1,600	80	4	. 0.2	. 0.01	. 0.0005
5	, 40,000	2,000	100	5	. 0.25	. 0.0125	. 0.000625
6	, 48,000	2,400	120	6	. 0.3	. 0.015	. 0.00075
7	, 56,000	2,800	140	7	. 0.35	. 0.0175	. 0.000875
8	, 64,000	3,200	160	8	. 0.4	. 0.02	. 0.001
9	, 72,000	3,600	180	9	. 0.45	. 0.0225	. 0.001125
10	, 80,000	4,000	200	10	. 0.5	. 0.025	. 0.00125
11	, 88,000	4,400	220	11	. 0.55	. 0.0275	. 0.001375
12	, 96,000	4,800	240	12	. 0.6	. 0.03	. 0.0015
13	, 104,000	5,200	260	13	. 0.65	. 0.0325	. 0.001625
14	, 112,000	5,600	280	14	. 0.7	. 0.035	. 0.00175
15	, 120,000	6,000	300	15	. 0.75	. 0.0375	. 0.001875
16	, 128,000	6,400	320	16	. 0.8	. 0.04	. 0.002
17	, 136,000	6,800	340	17	. 0.85	. 0.0425	. 0.002125
18	, 144,000	7,200	360	18	. 0.9	. 0.045	. 0.00225
19	, 152,000	7,600	380	19	. 0.95	. 0.0475	. 0.002375

== Origin ==
Map of Alaska highlighting North Slope Borough, part of Iñupiat Nunaat

The numerals began as an enrichment activity in 1994, when, during a math class exploring binary numbers at Harold Kaveolook middle school on Barter Island Kaktovik, Alaska, students noted that their language used a base-20 system.

They found that, when they tried to write numbers or do arithmetic with Arabic numerals, they did not have enough symbols to represent the Iñupiaq numbers.

They first addressed this lack by creating ten extra symbols, but found these were difficult to remember. The small middle school had only nine students so they were all able to work together to create a base-20 notation. Their teacher, William Bartley, guided them.

After brainstorming, the students came up with several qualities that an ideal system would have:

1. Visual simplicity: The symbols should be "easy to remember."
2. Iconicity: There should be a "clear relationship between the symbols and their meanings."
3. Efficiency: It should be "easy to write" the symbols, and they should be able to be "written quickly" without lifting the pencil from the paper.
4. Distinctiveness: They should "look very different from Arabic numerals," so there would not be any confusion between notation in the two systems.
5. Aesthetics: They should be pleasing to look at.

In base-20 positional notation, the number twenty is written with the digit for 1 followed by the digit for 0. The Iñupiaq language does not have a word for zero, and the students decided that the Kaktovik digit 0 should look like crossed arms, meaning that nothing was being counted.

When the middle-school pupils began to teach their new system to younger students in the school, the younger students tended to squeeze the numbers down to fit inside the same-sized block. In this way, they created an iconic notation with the sub-base of 5 forming the upper part of the digit, and the remainder forming the lower part. This proved visually helpful in doing arithmetic.

== Computation ==
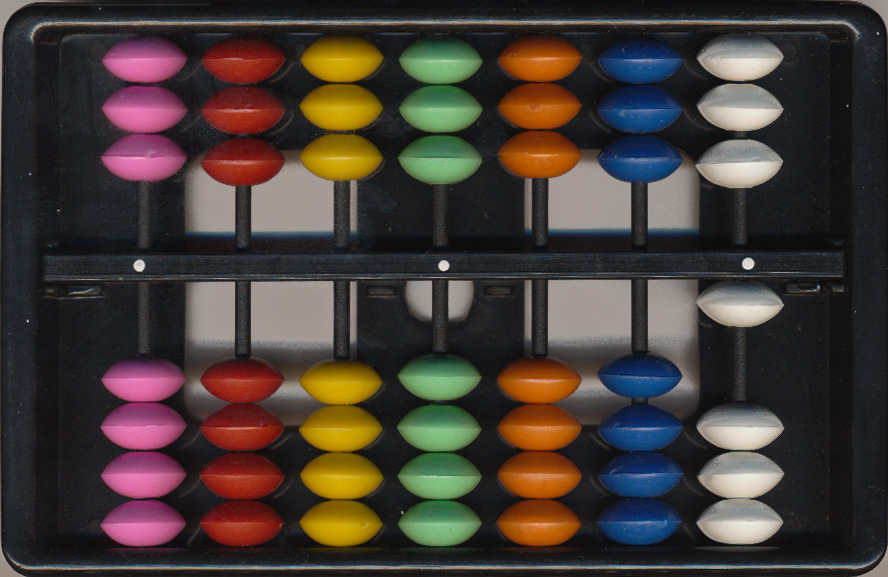
Iñupiaq abacus designed for use with the Kaktovik numerals

=== Abacus ===
The students built base-20 abacuses in the school workshop. These were initially intended to help the conversion from decimal to base-20 and vice versa, but the students found their design lent itself quite naturally to arithmetic in base-20. The upper section of their abacus had three beads in each column for the values of the sub-base of 5, and the lower section had four beads in each column for the remaining units.

=== Arithmetic ===
An advantage the students discovered of their new system was that arithmetic was easier than with the Arabic numerals. Adding two digits together would look like their sum. For example,

2 + 2 = 4
+ =

It was even easier for subtraction: one could simply look at the number and remove the appropriate number of strokes to get the answer. For example,

4 − 1 = 3
− =

Another advantage came in doing long division. The visual aspects and the sub-base of five made long division with large dividends almost as easy as short division, as it did not require writing in sub-tables for multiplying and subtracting the intermediate steps. The students could keep track of the strokes of the intermediate steps with colored pencils in an elaborated system of chunking.

Examples of long division
Simple long division
30,561_{10} ÷ 61_{10} = 501_{10}
3,G81_{20} ÷ 31_{20} = 151_{20}
÷ =
(black) The divisor goes into the first two digits of the dividend one time, for a one in the quotient.
(red) fits into the next two digits once (if rotated), so the next digit in the quotient is a rotated one (that is, a five).
(blue) The last two digits are matched once for a final one in the quotient.

Long division with more chunking
46,349,226_{10} ÷ 2,826_{10} = 16,401_{10}
E9D,D16_{20} ÷ 716_{20} = 2,101_{20}
÷ =
(black and red) The divisor goes into the first three digits of the dividend twice (once in black and once in red), for a two in the quotient.
(blue) goes into the next three digits once, for a one in the quotient.
(grey) does not fit into the next three digits, for a zero in the quotient.
(green) fits into the remaining digits once, for a final one in the quotient.

A simplified multiplication table can be made by first finding the products of each base digit, then the products of the bases and the sub-bases, and finally the product of each sub-base:

×	1	2	3	4
1	𝋁	𝋂	𝋃	𝋄
2	𝋂	𝋄	𝋆	𝋈
3	𝋃	𝋆	𝋉	𝋌
4	𝋄	𝋈	𝋌	𝋐

×	1	2	3	4
5	𝋅	𝋊	𝋏	𝋁 𝋀
10	𝋊	𝋁 𝋀	𝋁 𝋊	𝋂 𝋀
15	𝋏	𝋁 𝋊	𝋂 𝋅	𝋃 𝋀

×	5	10	15
5	𝋁 𝋅	𝋂 𝋊	𝋃 𝋏
10	𝋂 𝋊	𝋅 𝋀	𝋇 𝋊
15	𝋃 𝋏	𝋇 𝋊	𝋋 𝋅

These tables are functionally complete for multiplication operations using Kaktovik numerals, but for factors with both bases and sub-bases it is necessary to first disassociate them:

6 * 3 = 18
* = ( *) + ( *) =

In the above example the factor (6) is not found in the table, but its components, (1) and (5), are.

== Legacy ==
The Kaktovik numerals have gained wide use among Alaskan Iñupiat. They have been introduced into language-immersion programs and have helped revive base-20 counting, which had been falling into disuse among the Iñupiat due to the prevalence of the base-10 system in English-medium schools.

When the Kaktovik middle school students who invented the system were graduated to the high school in Barrow, Alaska (now renamed Utqiaġvik), in 1995, they took their invention with them. They were permitted to teach it to students at the local middle school, and the local community Iḷisaġvik College added an Inuit mathematics course to its catalog.

In 1996, the Commission on Inuit History Language and Culture officially adopted the numerals, and in 1998 the Inuit Circumpolar Council in Canada recommended the development and use of the Kaktovik numerals in that country.

== Significance ==
Scores on the California Achievement Test in mathematics for the Kaktovik middle school improved dramatically in 1997 compared to previous years. Before the introduction of the new numerals, the average score had been in the 20th percentile; after their introduction, scores rose to above the national average. It is theorized that being able to work in both base-10 and base-20 might have comparable advantages to those bilingual students have from engaging in two ways of thinking about the world.

The development of an indigenous numeral system helps to demonstrate to Alaskan-native students that math is embedded in their culture and language rather than being imparted by western culture. This is a shift from a previously commonly held view that mathematics was merely a necessity to get into a college or university. Non-native students can see a practical example of a different world view, a part of ethnomathematics.

== In Unicode ==
The Kaktovik numerals were added to the Unicode Standard in September, 2022, with the release of version 15.0. Several fonts support this block.

Kaktovik Numerals^{[1]}^{[2]} Official Unicode Consortium code chart (PDF)
	0	1	2	3	4	5	6	7	8	9	A	B	C	D	E	F
U+1D2Cx	𝋀	𝋁	𝋂	𝋃	𝋄	𝋅	𝋆	𝋇	𝋈	𝋉	𝋊	𝋋	𝋌	𝋍	𝋎	𝋏
U+1D2Dx	𝋐	𝋑	𝋒	𝋓												
Notes 1.As of Unicode version 18.0 2.Grey areas indicate non-assigned code points

Graphical display of Kaktovik Numerals^{[1]}^{[2]} Official Unicode Consortium code chart (PDF)
	0	1	2	3	4	5	6	7	8	9	A	B	C	D	E	F
U+1D2Cx	𝋀	𝋁	𝋂	𝋃	𝋄	𝋅	𝋆	𝋇	𝋈	𝋉	𝋊	𝋋	𝋌	𝋍	𝋎	𝋏
U+1D2Dx	𝋐	𝋑	𝋒	𝋓												
Notes 1.As of Unicode version 18.0 2.Grey areas indicate non-assigned code points

== See also ==
- Maya numerals, a quinary-vigesimal system from another American culture
