= Graph flattenability =

Flattenability in some $d$-dimensional normed vector space is a property of graphs which states that any embedding, or drawing, of the graph in some high dimension $d'$ can be "flattened" down to live in $d$-dimensions, such that the distances between pairs of points connected by edges are preserved. A graph $G$ is $d$-flattenable if every distance constraint system (DCS) with $G$ as its constraint graph has a $d$-dimensional framework. Flattenability was first called realizability, but the name was changed to avoid confusion with a graph having some DCS with a $d$-dimensional framework.

Flattenability has connections to structural rigidity, tensegrities, Cayley configuration spaces, and a variant of the graph realization problem.

== Definitions ==
A distance constraint system $(G,\delta)$, where $G=(V,E)$ is a graph and $\delta: E \rightarrow \mathbb{R}^{|E|}$ is an assignment of distances onto the edges of $G$, is $d$-flattenable in some normed vector space $\mathbb{R}^d$ if there exists a framework of $(G,\delta)$ in $d$-dimensions.

A graph $G=(V,E)$ is $d$-flattenable in $\mathbb{R}^d$ if every distance constraint system with $G$ as its constraint graph is $d$-flattenable.

Flattenability can also be defined in terms of Cayley configuration spaces; see connection to Cayley configuration spaces below.

== Properties ==
Closure under subgraphs. Flattenability is closed under taking subgraphs. To see this, observe that for some graph $G$, all possible embeddings of a subgraph $H$ of $G$ are contained in the set of all embeddings of $G$.

Minor-closed. Flattenability is a minor-closed property by a similar argument as above.

Flattening dimension. The flattening dimension of a flattenable graph $G$ in some normed vector space is the lowest dimension $d$ such that $G$ is $d$-flattenable. The flattening dimension of a graph is closely related to its gram dimension. The following is an upper-bound on the flattening dimension of an arbitrary graph under the $l_2$-norm.

Theorem. The flattening dimension of a graph $G = \left(V,E\right)$ under the $l_2$-norm is at most $O \left( \sqrt{\left| E \right|} \right)$.

For a detailed treatment of this topic, see Chapter 11.2 of Deza & Laurent.

== Euclidean flattenability ==
This section concerns flattenability results in Euclidean space, where distance is measured using the $l_2$ norm, also called the Euclidean norm.

=== 1-flattenable graphs ===
The following theorem is folklore and shows that the only forbidden minor for 1-flattenability is the complete graph $K_3$.

Theorem. A graph is 1-flattenable if and only if it is a forest.

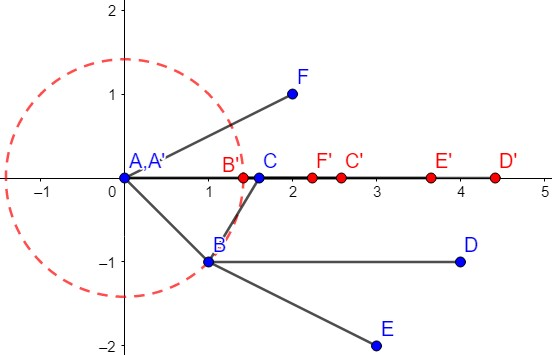
Figure 1. A 2-dimensional framework of a DCS whose graph is a tree with six vertices is shown in blue. A 1-dimensional framework of the same DCS is shown in red.

Proof. A proof can be found in Belk & Connelly. For one direction, a forest is a collection of trees, and any distance constraint system whose graph is a tree can be realized in 1-dimension. For the other direction, if a graph $G$ is not a forest, then it has the complete graph $K_3$ as a subgraph. Consider the DCS that assigns the distance 1 to the edges of the $K_4$ subgraph and the distance 0 to all other edges. This DCS has a realization in 2-dimensions as the 1-skeleton of a triangle, but it has no realization in 1-dimension.

This proof allowed for distances on edges to be 0, but the argument holds even when this is not allowed. See Belk & Connelly for a detailed explanation.

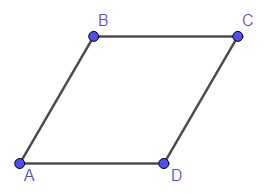
Figure 2. For certain linkages, this graph has a 1-dimensional realization (e.g. the assignment of 1 to every edge). However, $C_3$ can be obtained by contracting the edge $\bar{AB}$, so the graph is not 1-flattenable.

=== 2-flattenable graphs ===
The following theorem is folklore and shows that the only forbidden minor for 2-flattenability is the complete graph $K_4$.

Theorem. A graph is 2-flattenable if and only if it is a partial 2-tree.

Proof. A proof can be found in Belk & Connelly. For one direction, since flattenability is closed under taking subgraphs, it is sufficient to show that 2-trees are 2-flattenable. A 2-tree with $n$ vertices can be constructed recursively by taking a 2-tree with $n-1$ vertices and connecting a new vertex to the vertices of an existing edge. The base case is the $K_3$. Proceed by induction on the number of vertices $n$. When $n=3$, consider any distance assignment $\delta$ on the edges $K_3$. Note that if $\delta$ does not obey the triangle inequality, then this DCS does not have a realization in any dimension. Without loss of generality, place the first vertex $v_1$ at the origin and the second vertex $v_2$ along the x-axis such that $\delta_{12}$ is satisfied. The third vertex $v_3$ can be placed at an intersection of the circles with centers $v_1$ and $v_2$ and radii $\delta_{13}$ and $\delta_{23}$ respectively. This method of placement is called a ruler and compass construction. Hence, $K_3$ is 2-flattenable.

Now, assume a 2-tree with $k$ vertices is 2-flattenable. By definition, a 2-tree with $k+1$ vertices is a 2-tree with $k$ vertices, say $T$, and an additional vertex $u$ connected to the vertices of an existing edge in $T$. By the inductive hypothesis, $T$ is 2-flattenable. Finally, by a similar ruler and compass construction argument as in the base case, $u$ can be placed such that it lies in the plane. Thus, 2-trees are 2-flattenable by induction.

If a graph $G$ is not a partial 2-tree, then it contains $K_4$ as a minor. Assigning the distance of 1 to the edges of the $K_4$ minor and the distance of 0 to all other edges yields a DCS with a realization in 3-dimensions as the 1-skeleton of a tetrahedra. However, this DCS has no realization in 2-dimensions: when attempting to place the fourth vertex using a ruler and compass construction, the three circles defined by the fourth vertex do not all intersect.

Example. Consider the graph in figure 2. Adding the edge $\bar{AC}$ turns it into a 2-tree; hence, it is a partial 2-tree. Thus, it is 2-flattenable.

Example. The wheel graph $W_5$ contains $K_4$ as a minor. Thus, it is not 2-flattenable.

=== 3-flattenable graphs ===
The class of 3-flattenable graphs strictly contains the class of partial 3-trees. More precisely, the forbidden minors for partial 3-trees are the complete graph $K_5$, the 1-skeleton of the octahedron $K_{2,2,2}$, $V_8$, and $C_5 \times C_2$, but $V_8$, and $C_5 \times C_2$ are 3-flattenable. These graphs are shown in Figure 3. Furthermore, the following theorem from Belk & Connelly shows that the only forbidden minors for 3-flattenability are $K_5$ and $K_{2,2,2}$.

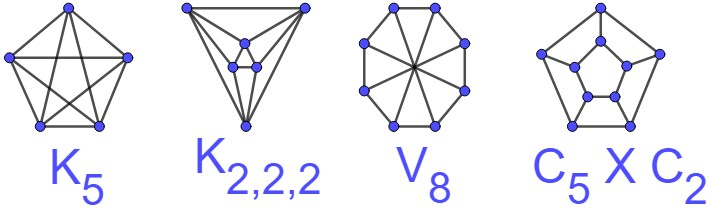
Figure 3. The graphs of interest for 3-flattenability.

Theorem. A graph is 3-flattenable if and only if it does not have $K_5$ or $K_{2,2,2}$ as a minor.

Proof Idea: The proof given in Belk & Connelly assumes that $V_8$, and $C_5 \times C_2$ are 3-realizable. This is proven in the same article using mathematical tools from rigidity theory, specifically those concerning tensegrities. The complete graph $K_5$ is not 3-flattenable, and the same argument that shows $K_4$ is not 2-flattenable and $K_3$ is not 1-flattenable works here: assigning the distance 1 to the edges of $K_5$ yields a DCS with no realization in 3-dimensions. Figure 4 gives a visual proof that the graph $K_{2,2,2}$ is not 3-flattenable. Vertices 1, 2, and 3 form a degenerate triangle. For the edges between vertices 1- 5, edges $(1,4)$ and $(3,4)$ are assigned the distance $\sqrt{2}$ and all other edges are assigned the distance 1. Vertices 1- 5 have unique placements in 3-dimensions, up to congruence. Vertex 6 has 2 possible placements in 3-dimensions: 1 on each side of the plane $\Pi$ defined by vertices 1, 2, and 4. Hence, the edge $(5,6)$ has two distance values that can be realized in 3-dimensions. However, vertex 6 can revolve around the plane $\Pi$ in 4-dimensions while satisfying all constraints, so the edge $(5,6)$ has infinitely many distance values that can only be realized in 4-dimensions or higher. Thus, $K_{2,2,2}$ is not 3-flattenable. The fact that these graphs are not 3-flattenable proves that any graph with either $K_5$ or $K_{2,2,2}$ as a minor is not 3-flattenable.

Figure 4. Construction steps to show the 1-skeleton of an octahedron is not 3-flattenable.

The other direction shows that if a graph $G$ does not have $K_5$ or $K_{2,2,2}$ as a minor, then $G$ can be constructed from partial 3-trees, $V_8$, and $C_5 \times C_2$ via 1-sums, 2-sums, and 3-sums. These graphs are all 3-flattenable and these operations preserve 3-flattenability, so $G$ is 3-flattenable.

The techniques in this proof yield the following result from Belk & Connelly.

Theorem. Every 3-realizable graph is a subgraph of a graph that can be obtained by a sequence of 1-sums, 2-sums, and 3-sums of the graphs $K_4$, $V_8$, and $C_5 \times C_2$.

Example. The previous theorem can be applied to show that the 1-skeleton of a cube is 3-flattenable. Start with the graph $K_4$, which is the 1-skeleton of a tetrahedron. On each face of the tetrahedron, perform a 3-sum with another $K_4$ graph, i.e. glue two tetrahedra together on their faces. The resulting graph contains the cube as a subgraph and is 3-flattenable.

=== In higher dimensions ===
Giving a forbidden minor characterization of $d$-flattenable graphs, for dimension $d>3$, is an open problem. For any dimension $d$, $K_{d+2}$ and the 1-skeleton of the $d$-dimensional analogue of an octahedron are forbidden minors for $d$-flattenability. It is conjectured that the number of forbidden minors for $d$-flattenability grows asymptotically to the number of forbidden minors for partial $d$-trees, and there are over $75$ forbidden minors for partial 4-trees.

An alternative characterization of $d$-flattenable graphs relates flattenability to Cayley configuration spaces. See the section on the connection to Cayley configuration spaces.

=== Connection to the graph realization problem ===
Given a distance constraint system and a dimension $d$, the graph realization problem asks for a $d$-dimensional framework of the DCS, if one exists. There are algorithms to realize $d$-flattenable graphs in $d$-dimensions, for $d \leq 3$, that run in polynomial time in the size of the graph. For $d=1$, realizing each tree in a forest in 1-dimension is trivial to accomplish in polynomial time. An algorithm for $d=2$ is mentioned in Belk & Connelly. For $d=3$, the algorithm in So & Ye obtains a framework $r$ of a DCS using semidefinite programming techniques and then utilizes the "folding" method described in Belk to transform $r$ into a 3-dimensional framework.

== Flattenability under p-norms ==
This section concerns flattenability results for graphs under general $p$-norms, for $1 \leq p \leq \infty$.

=== Connection to algebraic geometry ===
Determining the flattenability of a graph under a general $p$-norm can be accomplished using methods in algebraic geometry, as suggested in Belk & Connelly. The question of whether a graph $G=(V,E)$ is $d$-flattenable is equivalent to determining if two semi-algebraic sets are equal. One algorithm to compare two semi-algebraic sets takes $(4|E|)^{O\left(nd|V|^2\right)}$ time.

=== Connection to Cayley configuration spaces ===
For general $l_p$-norms, there is a close relationship between flattenability and Cayley configuration spaces. The following theorem and its corollary are found in Sitharam & Willoughby.

Theorem. A graph $G$ is $d$-flattenable if and only if for every subgraph $H=G \setminus F$ of $G$ resulting from removing a set of edges $F$ from $G$ and any $l^p_p$-distance vector $\delta_H$ such that the DCS $(H,\delta_H)$ has a realization, the $d$-dimensional Cayley configuration space of $(H,\delta_H)$ over $F$ is convex.

Corollary. A graph $G$ is not $d$-flattenable if there exists some subgraph $H=G \setminus F$ of $G$ and some $l^p_p$-distance vector $\delta$ such that the $d$-dimensional Cayley configuration space of $(H,\delta_H)$ over $F$ is not convex.

=== 2-Flattenability under the l_{1} and l_{∞} norms ===
The $l_1$ and $l_{\infty}$ norms are equivalent up to rotating axes in 2-dimensions, so 2-flattenability results for either norm hold for both. This section uses the $l_1$-norm. The complete graph $K_4$ is 2-flattenable under the $l_1$-norm and $K_5$ is 3-flattenable, but not 2-flattenable. These facts contribute to the following results on 2-flattenability under the $l_1$-norm found in Sitharam & Willoughby.

Observation. The set of 2-flattenable graphs under the $l_1$-norm (and $l_{\infty}$-norm) strictly contains the set of 2-flattenable graphs under the $l_2$-norm.

Theorem. A 2-sum of 2-flattenable graphs is 2-flattenable if and only if at most one graph has a $K_4$ minor.

The fact that $K_4$ is 2-flattenable but $K_5$ is not has implications on the forbidden minor characterization for 2-flattenable graphs under the $l_1$-norm. Specifically, the minors of $K_5$ could be forbidden minors for 2-flattenability. The following results explore these possibilities and give the complete set of forbidden minors.

Theorem. The banana graph, or $K_5$ with one edge removed, is not 2-flattenable.

Observation. The graph obtained by removing two edges that are incident to the same vertex from $K_5$ is 2-flattenable.

Observation. Connected graphs on 5 vertices with 7 edges are 2-flattenable.

The only minor of $K_5$ left is the wheel graph $W_5$, and the following result shows that this is one of the forbidden minors.

Theorem. A graph is 2-flattenable under the $l_1$- or $l_{\infty}$-norm if and only if it does not have either of the following graphs as minors:

- the wheel graph $W_5$ or
- the graph obtained by taking the 2-sum of two copies of $K_4$ and removing the shared edge.

=== Connection to structural rigidity ===
This section relates flattenability to concepts in structural (combinatorial) rigidity theory, such as the rigidity matroid. The following results concern the $l^p_p$-distance cone $\Phi_{n,l_p}$, i.e., the set of all $l^p_p$-distance vectors that can be realized as a configuration of $n$ points in some dimension. A proof that this set is a cone can be found in Ball. The $d$-stratum of this cone $\Phi^d_{n,l_p}$ are the vectors that can be realized as a configuration of $n$ points in $d$-dimensions. The projection of $\Phi_{n,l_p}$ or $\Phi^d_{n,l_p}$ onto the edges of a graph $G$ is the set of $l^p_p$ distance vectors that can be realized as the edge-lengths of some embedding of $G$.

A generic property of a graph $G$ is one that almost all frameworks of distance constraint systems, whose graph is $G$, have. A framework of a DCS $(G,\delta)$ under an $l_p$-norm is a generic framework (with respect to $d$-flattenability) if the following two conditions hold:

1. there is an open neighborhood $\Omega$ of $\delta$ in the interior of the cone $\Phi_{n,l_p}$, and
2. the framework is $d$-flattenable if and only if all frameworks in $\Omega$ are $d$-flattenable.

Condition (1) ensures that the neighborhood $\Omega$ has full rank. In other words, $\Omega$ has dimension equal to the flattening dimension of the complete graph $K_n$ under the $l_p$-norm. See Kitson for a more detailed discussion of generic framework for $l_p$-norms. The following results are found in Sitharam & Willoughby.

Theorem. A graph $G$ is $d$-flattenable if and only if every generic framework of $G$ is $d$-flattenable.

Theorem. $d$-flattenability is not a generic property of graphs, even for the $l_2$-norm.

Theorem. A generic $d$-flattenable framework of a graph $G$ exists if and only if $G$ is independent in the generic $d$-dimensional rigidity matroid.

Corollary. A graph $G$ is $d$-flattenable only if $G$ is independent in the $d$-dimensional rigidity matroid.

Theorem. For general $l_p$-norms, a graph $G$ is

1. independent in the generic $d$-dimensional rigidity matroid if and only if the projection of the $d$-stratum $\Phi^d_{n,l_p}$ onto the edges of $G$ has dimension equal to the number of edges of $G$;
2. maximally independent in the generic $d$-dimensional rigidity matroid if and only if projecting the $d$-stratum $\Phi^d_{n,l_p}$ onto the edges of $G$ preserves its dimension and this dimension is equal to the number of edges of $G$;
3. rigid in $d$-dimensions if and only if projecting the $d$-stratum $\Phi^d_{n,l_p}$ onto the edges of $G$ preserves its dimension;
4. not independent in the generic $d$-dimensional rigidity matroid if and only if the dimension of the projection of the $d$-stratum $\Phi^d_{n,l_p}$ onto the edges of $G$ is strictly less than the minimum of the dimension of $\Phi^d_{n,l_p}$ and the number of edges of $G$.
