= Ethnocomputing =

Ethnocomputing is the study of the interactions between computing and culture. It is carried out through theoretical analysis, empirical investigation, and design implementation. It includes research on the impact of computing on society, as well as the reverse: how cultural, historical, personal, and societal origins and surroundings cause and affect the innovation, development, diffusion, maintenance, and appropriation of computational artifacts or ideas. From the ethnocomputing perspective, no computational technology is culturally "neutral," and no cultural practice is a computational void. Instead of considering culture to be a hindrance for software engineering, culture should be seen as a resource for innovation and design.

== Origins ==
Ethnocomputing has its origins in ethnomathematics. There are a large number of studies in ethnomathematics that could be considered ethnocomputing as well (e.g., Eglash (1999) and Ascher & Ascher (1981)). The idea of a separate field was introduced in 1992 by Anthony Petrillo in Responsive Evaluation of Mathematics Education in a Community of Jos, Nigeria, Dissertation (Ph.D.): State University of New York at Buffalo, which Petrillo elaborated a bit more on in March 1994, Ethnocomputers in Nigerian Computer Education, paper presented at the 31st Annual Conference of the Mathematical Association of Nigeria. Just like computer science is nowadays considered to be a field of research distinct from mathematics, ethnocomputing is considered to be a research topic distinct from ethnomathematics. Some aspects of ethnocomputing that have their roots in ethnomathematics are listed below:

- Counting and sorting: The use of a systematic way to compare and order discrete objects
- Locating: Exploring one's spatial environment and conceptualizing and symbolizing that environment with models, maps, drawings, and other devices
- Measuring: Quantifying qualities like length and weight for the purposes of, for instance, comparing, classifying, or ordering objects
- Designing: Applying formal or non-formal algorithmic or computational ideas in arts or design
- Playing: Devising and engaging in games and pastimes with more or less formalized rules that all players must abide by
- Explaining: Finding systematic ways to represent phenomena or the relationships between phenomena
