= Folk theorem =

Folk theorem or folklore theorem may refer to:

- Mathematical folklore, theorems that are widely known to mathematicians but cannot be traced back to an individual
- Folk theorem (game theory), a general feasibility theorem
- Folk theorem (physics), conjecture in theoretical physics
- Ethnomathematics, the study of the relationship between mathematics and culture
