= Imre Lakatos =

Hungarian philosopher of mathematics and science (1922–1974)

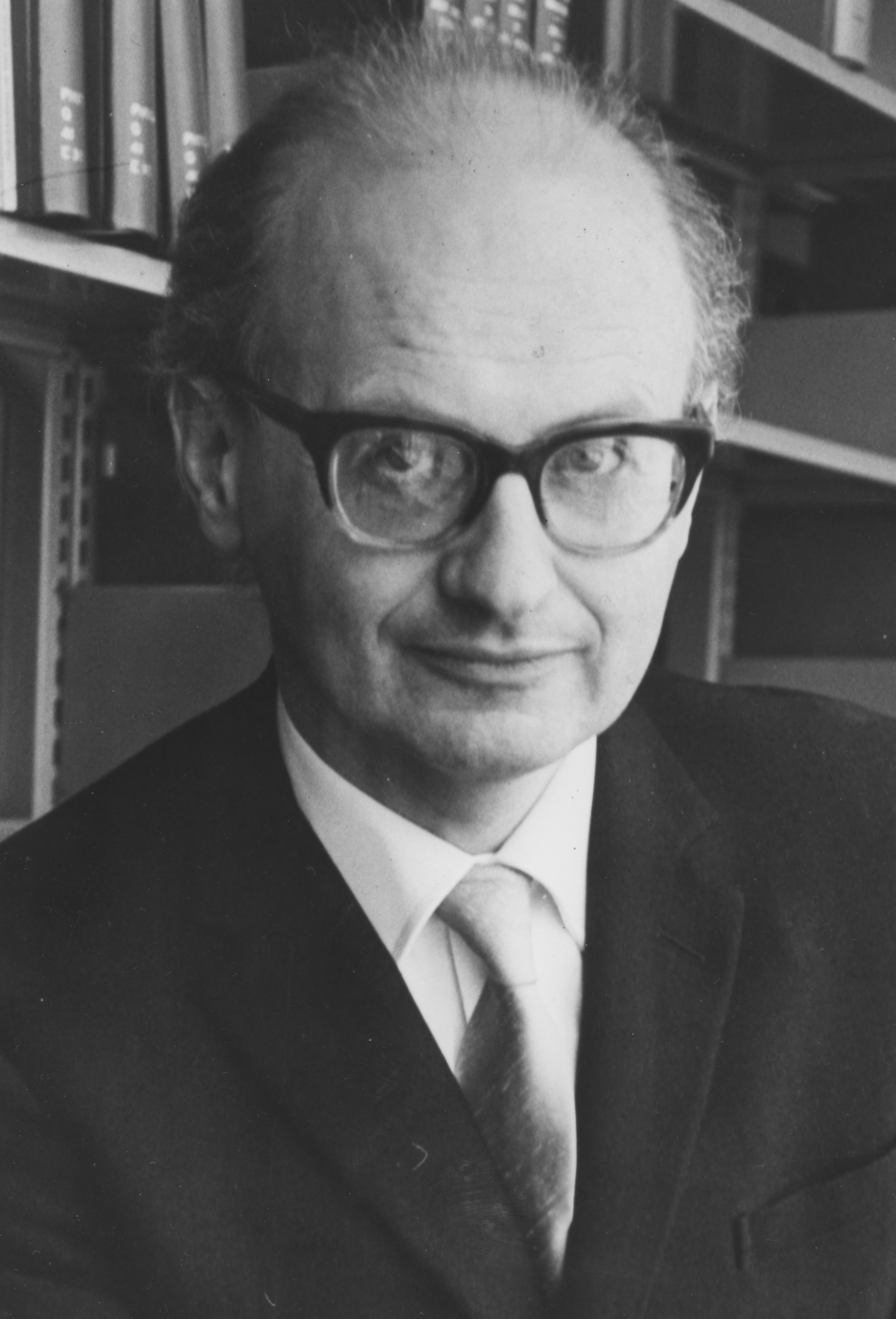
- Lakatos, c. 1960s
- Born: Imre Lipsitz; 9 November 1922; Debrecen, Kingdom of Hungary
- Died: 2 February 1974 (aged 51); London, England
- Political party: MKP (1945–1948); MDP (1948–1950)

Education
- Education: University of Budapest; Eötvös József Collegium; University of Debrecen (PhD, 1947); Moscow State University; University of Cambridge (PhD, 1961)
- Thesis: Essays in the Logic of Mathematical Discovery (1961)
- Doctoral advisor: R. B. Braithwaite
- Other advisor: Sofya Yanovskaya

Philosophical work
- Era: 20th-century philosophy
- Region: Western philosophy
- School: Analytic philosophy Historical turn Fallibilism; Mathematical quasi-empiricism Historiographical internalism
- Institutions: London School of Economics
- Doctoral students: Donald A. Gillies; Spiro Latsis; John Worrall
- Notable students: Alex Callinicos
- Main interests: Philosophy of mathematics, philosophy of science, history of science, epistemology, politics
- Notable ideas: Research programme, method of proofs and refutations, methodology of scientific research programmes, methodology of historiographical research programmes, negative heuristic vs. positive heuristic, progressive vs. degenerative research programmes, rational reconstruction, mathematical quasi-empiricism, criticism of logical positivism and formalism, sophisticated falsificationism,

Imre Lakatos (UK: /ˈlækətɒs/, US: /-toʊs/; Hungarian: Lakatos Imre [ˈlɒkɒtoʃ ˈimrɛ]; 9 November 1922 – 2 February 1974) was a Hungarian-born philosopher of mathematics and science, known for his thesis of the fallibility of mathematics and its "methodology of proofs and refutations" in its pre-axiomatic stages of development, and also for introducing the concept of the "research programme" in his methodology of scientific research programmes.

== Life ==
Lakatos was born Imre Lipsitz to a well-to-do Hungarian-Jewish family in Debrecen, Hungary, in 1922. He received a degree in mathematics, physics, and philosophy from the University of Debrecen in 1944. In March 1944, the Germans invaded Hungary, and Lakatos, along with Éva Révész, his then-girlfriend and subsequent wife, formed a Marxist resistance group. In May of that year, the group was joined by Éva Izsák, a 19-year-old Jewish antifascist activist. Lakatos, considering that there was a risk that she would be captured and forced to betray them, decided that her duty to the group was to commit suicide. Subsequently, a member of the group took her to Debrecen and gave her cyanide.

During the occupation, Lakatos avoided Nazi persecution of Jews by changing his surname to Molnár. His mother and grandmother were murdered in Auschwitz. He changed his surname once again to Lakatos (Locksmith) in honor of Géza Lakatos.

After the war, from 1947, he worked as a senior official in the Hungarian Ministry of Education. He also continued his education with a PhD at Debrecen University (awarded in 1947) and also attended György Lukács's weekly Wednesday afternoon private seminars. He also studied at the Moscow State University under the supervision of Sofya Yanovskaya in 1949. When he returned, however, he found himself on the losing side of internal arguments within the Hungarian communist party and was imprisoned on charges of revisionism from 1950 to 1953. More of Lakatos's activities in Hungary after World War II have recently become known. In fact, Lakatos was a hardline Stalinist and, despite his young age, had an important role between 1945 and 1950 (his own arrest and jailing) in building up the Communist rule, especially in cultural life and academia, in Hungary.

After his release, Lakatos returned to academic life, doing mathematical research and translating George Pólya's How to Solve It into Hungarian. Still nominally a communist, his political views had shifted markedly, and he was involved with at least one dissident student group in the lead-up to the 1956 Hungarian Revolution.

After the Soviet Union invaded Hungary in November 1956, Lakatos fled to Vienna and later reached England. He lived there for the rest of his life, however, he never achieved British citizenship. He received a PhD in philosophy in 1961 from the University of Cambridge; his doctoral thesis was entitled Essays in the Logic of Mathematical Discovery, and his doctoral advisor was R. B. Braithwaite. The book Proofs and Refutations: The Logic of Mathematical Discovery, published after his death, is based on this work.

In 1960, he was appointed to a position in the London School of Economics (LSE), where he wrote on the philosophy of mathematics and the philosophy of science. The LSE philosophy of science department at that time included Karl Popper, Joseph Agassi and J. O. Wisdom. It was Agassi who first introduced Lakatos to Popper under the rubric of his applying a fallibilist methodology of conjectures and refutations to mathematics in his Cambridge PhD thesis.

With co-editor Alan Musgrave, he edited the often cited Criticism and the Growth of Knowledge, the Proceedings of the International Colloquium in the Philosophy of Science, London, 1965. Published in 1970, the 1965 Colloquium included well-known speakers delivering papers in response to Thomas Kuhn's The Structure of Scientific Revolutions.

In January 1971, he became editor of the British Journal for the Philosophy of Science, which J. O. Wisdom had built up before departing in 1965, and he continued as editor until his death in 1974, after which it was then edited jointly for many years by his LSE colleagues John W. N. Watkins and John Worrall, Lakatos's ex-research assistant.

Lakatos and his colleague Spiro Latsis had organized an international conference in Greece in 1975, and it went ahead despite his death. It was devoted entirely to historical case studies in Lakatos's methodology of research programmes in the physical sciences and economics. These case studies covered cases such as Einstein's relativity programme, Fresnel's wave theory of light and neoclassical economics, and were published by Cambridge University Press in two separate volumes in 1976, one devoted to physical sciences and Lakatos's general programme for rewriting the history of science, with a concluding critique by his great friend Paul Feyerabend, and the other devoted to economics.

He remained at LSE until his sudden death in 1974 of a heart attack at the age of 51. The Lakatos Award was set up by the school in his memory. His last lectures along with parts of his correspondence with Paul Feyerabend have been published in For and Against Method.

== Philosophical work ==
=== Philosophy of mathematics ===
Lakatos's philosophy of mathematics was inspired by both Hegel's and Marx's dialectic, by Karl Popper's theory of knowledge, and by the work of mathematician George Pólya.

The 1976 book Proofs and Refutations is based on the first three chapters of his 1961 four-chapter doctoral thesis Essays in the Logic of Mathematical Discovery. But its first chapter is Lakatos's own revision of its chapter 1 that was first published as Proofs and Refutations in four parts in 1963–64 in the British Journal for the Philosophy of Science. It is largely taken up by a fictional dialogue set in a mathematics class. The students are attempting to prove the formula for the Euler characteristic in algebraic topology, which is a theorem about the properties of polyhedra, namely that for all polyhedra the number of their vertices V minus the number of their edges E plus the number of their faces F is 2 (V − E + F = 2). The dialogue is meant to represent the actual series of attempted proofs that mathematicians historically offered for the conjecture, only to be repeatedly refuted by counterexamples. Often, the students paraphrase famous mathematicians such as Cauchy, as noted in Lakatos's extensive footnotes.

Lakatos termed the polyhedral counterexamples to Euler's formula monsters and distinguished three ways of handling these objects: Firstly, monster-barring, by which means the theorem in question could not be applied to such objects. Secondly, monster-adjustment, whereby by making a re-appraisal of the monster it could be made to obey the proposed theorem. Thirdly, exception handling, a further distinct process. These distinct strategies have been taken up in qualitative physics, where the terminology of monsters has been applied to apparent counterexamples, and the techniques of monster-barring and monster-adjustment recognized as approaches to the refinement of the analysis of a physical issue.

What Lakatos tried to establish was that no theorem of informal mathematics is final or perfect. This means that we should not think that a theorem is ultimately true, only that no counterexample has yet been found. Once a counterexample is found, we adjust the theorem, possibly extending the domain of its validity. This is a continuous way our knowledge accumulates, through the logic and process of proofs and refutations. (If axioms are given for a branch of mathematics, however, Lakatos claimed that proofs from those axioms were tautological, i.e. logically true.)

Lakatos proposed an account of mathematical knowledge based on the idea of heuristics. In Proofs and Refutations the concept of "heuristic" was not well developed, although Lakatos gave several basic rules for finding proofs and counterexamples to conjectures. He thought that mathematical "thought experiments" are a valid way to discover mathematical conjectures and proofs, and sometimes called his philosophy "quasi-empiricism".

However, he also conceived of the mathematical community as carrying on a kind of dialectic to decide which mathematical proofs are valid and which are not. Therefore, he fundamentally disagreed with the "formalist" conception of proof that prevailed in Frege's and Russell's logicism, which defines proof simply in terms of formal validity.

On its first publication as an article in the British Journal for the Philosophy of Science in 1963–64, Proofs and Refutations became highly influential on new work in the philosophy of mathematics, although few agreed with Lakatos's strong disapproval of formal proof. Before his death, he had been planning to return to the philosophy of mathematics and apply his theory of research programmes to it. Lakatos, Worrall and Zahar use Poincaré (1893) to answer one of the major problems perceived by critics, namely that the pattern of mathematical research depicted in Proofs and Refutations does not faithfully represent most of the actual activity of contemporary mathematicians.

==== Cauchy and uniform convergence ====
In a 1966 text Cauchy and the continuum, Lakatos re-examines the history of the calculus, with special regard to Augustin-Louis Cauchy and the concept of uniform convergence, in the light of non-standard analysis. Lakatos is concerned that historians of mathematics should not judge the evolution of mathematics in terms of currently fashionable theories. As an illustration, he examines Cauchy's proof that the sum of a series of continuous functions is itself continuous. Lakatos is critical of those who would see Cauchy's proof, with its failure to make explicit a suitable convergence hypothesis, merely as an inadequate approach to Weierstrassian analysis. Lakatos sees in such an approach a failure to realize that Cauchy's concept of the continuum differed from currently dominant views.

=== Research programmes ===
Lakatos's second major contribution to the philosophy of science was his model of the "research programme", which he formulated in an attempt to resolve the perceived conflict between Popper's falsificationism and the revolutionary structure of science described by Kuhn. Popper's standard of falsificationism was widely taken to imply that a theory should be abandoned as soon as any evidence appears to challenge it, while Kuhn's descriptions of scientific activity were taken to imply that science is most fruitful during periods in which popular, or "normal", theories are supported despite known anomalies. Lakatos's model of the research programme aims to combine Popper's adherence to empirical validity with Kuhn's appreciation for conventional consistency.

A Lakatosian research programme is based on a hard core of theoretical assumptions that cannot be abandoned or altered without abandoning the programme altogether. More modest and specific theories that are formulated in order to explain evidence that threatens the "hard core" are termed auxiliary hypotheses. Auxiliary hypotheses are considered expendable by the adherents of the research programme—they may be altered or abandoned as empirical discoveries require in order to "protect" the "hard core". Whereas Popper was generally read as hostile toward such ad hoc theoretical amendments, Lakatos argued that they can be progressive, i.e. productive, when they enhance the programme's explanatory and/or predictive power, and that they are at least permissible until some better system of theories is devised and the research programme is replaced entirely. The difference between a progressive and a degenerative research programme lies, for Lakatos, in whether the recent changes to its auxiliary hypotheses have achieved this greater explanatory/predictive power or whether they have been made simply out of the necessity of offering some response in the face of new and troublesome evidence. A degenerative research programme indicates that a new and more progressive system of theories should be sought to replace the currently prevailing one, but until such a system of theories can be conceived of and agreed upon, abandonment of the current one would only further weaken our explanatory power and would therefore be unacceptable for Lakatos. Lakatos's primary example of a research programme that had been successful in its time and then progressively replaced is that founded by Isaac Newton, with his three laws of motion forming the "hard core".

The Lakatosian research programme deliberately provides a framework within which research can be conducted on the basis of "first principles" (the "hard core"), which are shared by those involved in the research programme and accepted for the purpose of that research without further proof or debate. In this regard, it is similar to Kuhn's notion of a paradigm. Lakatos sought to replace Kuhn's paradigm, guided by an irrational "psychology of discovery", with a research programme no less coherent or consistent, yet guided by Popper's objectively valid logic of discovery.

Lakatos was following Pierre Duhem's idea that one can always protect a cherished theory (or part of one) from hostile evidence by redirecting the criticism toward other theories or parts thereof. (See Confirmation holism and Duhem–Quine thesis). This aspect of falsification had been acknowledged by Popper.

Popper's theory, falsificationism, proposed that scientists put forward theories and that nature "shouts NO" in the form of an inconsistent observation. According to Popper, it is irrational for scientists to maintain their theories in the face of nature's rejection, as Kuhn had described them doing. For Lakatos, however, "It is not that we propose a theory and Nature may shout NO; rather, we propose a maze of theories, and nature may shout INCONSISTENT". The continued adherence to a programme's "hard core", augmented with adaptable auxiliary hypotheses, reflects Lakatos's less strict standard of falsificationism.

Lakatos saw himself as merely extending Popper's ideas, which changed over time and were interpreted by many in conflicting ways. In his 1968 article "Criticism and the Methodology of Scientific Research Programmes", Lakatos contrasted Popper0, the "naive falsificationist" who demanded unconditional rejection of any theory in the face of any anomaly (an interpretation Lakatos saw as erroneous but that he nevertheless referred to often); Popper1, the more nuanced and conservatively interpreted philosopher; and Popper2, the "sophisticated methodological falsificationist" that Lakatos claims is the logical extension of the correctly interpreted ideas of Popper1 (and who is therefore essentially Lakatos himself). It is, therefore, very difficult to determine which ideas and arguments concerning the research programme should be credited to whom.

While Lakatos dubbed his theory "sophisticated methodological falsificationism", it is not "methodological" in the strict sense of asserting universal methodological rules by which all scientific research must abide. Rather, it is methodological only in that theories are only abandoned according to a methodical progression from worse theories to better theories—a stipulation overlooked by what Lakatos terms "dogmatic falsificationism". Methodological assertions in the strict sense, pertaining to which methods are valid and which are invalid, are themselves contained within the research programmes that choose to adhere to them, and should be judged according to whether the research programmes that adhere to them prove progressive or degenerative. Lakatos divided these "methodological rules" within a research programme into its "negative heuristics", i.e., what research methods and approaches to avoid, and its "positive heuristics", i.e., what research methods and approaches to prefer. While the "negative heuristic" protects the hard core, the "positive heuristic" directs the modification of the hard core and auxiliary hypotheses in a general direction.

Lakatos claimed that not all changes of the auxiliary hypotheses of a research programme (which he calls "problem shifts") are equally productive or acceptable. He took the view that these "problem shifts" should be evaluated not just by their ability to defend the "hard core" by explaining apparent anomalies, but also by their ability to produce new facts, in the form of predictions or additional explanations. Adjustments that accomplish nothing more than the maintenance of the "hard core" mark the research programme as degenerative.

Lakatos's model provides for the possibility of a research programme that is not only continued in the presence of troublesome anomalies but that remains progressive despite them. For Lakatos, it is essentially necessary to continue on with a theory that we basically know cannot be completely true, and it is even possible to make scientific progress in doing so, as long as we remain receptive to a better research programme that may eventually be conceived of. In this sense, it is, for Lakatos, an acknowledged misnomer to refer to "falsification" or "refutation", when it is not the truth or falsity of a theory that is solely determining whether we consider it "falsified" but also the availability of a less false theory. A theory cannot be rightfully "falsified", according to Lakatos, until it is superseded by a better (i.e. more progressive) research programme. This is what he says is happening in the historical periods Kuhn describes as revolutions and what makes them rational as opposed to mere leaps of faith or periods of deranged social psychology, as Kuhn argued.

=== Pseudoscience ===
According to the demarcation criterion of pseudoscience proposed by Lakatos, a theory is pseudoscientific if it fails to make any novel predictions of previously unknown phenomena or its predictions were mostly falsified, in contrast with scientific theories, which predict novel fact(s). Progressive scientific theories are those that have their novel facts confirmed, and degenerate scientific theories, which can degenerate so much that they become pseudo-science, are those whose predictions of novel facts are refuted. As he put it:

"A given fact is explained scientifically only if a new fact is predicted with it ... The idea of growth and the concept of empirical character are soldered into one." See pages 34–35 of The Methodology of Scientific Research Programmes, 1978.

Lakatos's own key examples of pseudoscience were Ptolemaic astronomy, Immanuel Velikovsky's planetary cosmogony, Freudian psychoanalysis, 20th-century Soviet Marxism, Lysenko's biology, Niels Bohr's quantum mechanics post-1924, astrology, and psychiatry.

==== Darwin's theory ====
In his 1973 Scientific Method Lecture 1 at the London School of Economics, he also claimed that "nobody to date has yet found a demarcation criterion according to which Darwin can be described as scientific".

Almost 20 years after Lakatos's 1973 challenge to the scientificity of Darwin, in her 1991 The Ant and the Peacock, LSE lecturer and ex-colleague of Lakatos, Helena Cronin, attempted to establish that Darwinian theory was empirically scientific in respect of at least being supported by evidence of likeness in the diversity of life forms in the world, explained by descent with modification. She wrote that

our usual idea of corroboration as requiring the successful prediction of novel facts ... Darwinian theory was not strong on temporally novel predictions. ... however familiar the evidence and whatever role it played in the construction of the theory, it still confirms the theory.

=== Rational reconstructions of the history of science ===
In his 1970 article "History of Science and Its Rational Reconstructions" Lakatos proposed a dialectical historiographical meta-method for evaluating different theories of scientific method, namely by means of their comparative success in explaining the actual history of science and scientific revolutions on the one hand, whilst on the other providing a historiographical framework for rationally reconstructing the history of science as anything more than merely inconsequential rambling. The article started with his now renowned dictum "Philosophy of science without history of science is empty; history of science without philosophy of science is blind".

However, neither Lakatos himself nor his collaborators ever completed the first part of this dictum by showing that in any scientific revolution the great majority of the relevant scientific community converted just when Lakatos's criterion – one programme successfully predicting some novel facts whilst its competitor degenerated – was satisfied. Indeed, for the historical case studies in his 1968 article "Criticism and the Methodology of Scientific Research Programmes" he had openly admitted as much, commenting: "In this paper it is not my purpose to go on seriously to the second stage of comparing rational reconstructions with actual history for any lack of historicity."

== Criticism ==
=== Feyerabend ===
Paul Feyerabend argued that Lakatos's methodology was not a methodology at all, but merely "words that sound like the elements of a methodology". He argued that Lakatos's methodology was no different in practice from epistemological anarchism, Feyerabend's own position. He wrote in Science in a Free Society (after Lakatos's death) that:

Lakatos realized and admitted that the existing standards of rationality, standards of logic included, were too restrictive and would have hindered science had they been applied with determination. He therefore permitted the scientist to violate them (he admits that science is not "rational" in the sense of these standards). However, he demanded that research programmes show certain features in the long run — they must be progressive... I have argued that this demand no longer restricts scientific practice. Any development agrees with it.

Lakatos and Feyerabend planned to produce a joint work in which Lakatos would develop a rationalist description of science, and Feyerabend would attack it. The correspondence between Lakatos and Feyerabend, where the two discussed the project, has since been reproduced, with commentary, by Matteo Motterlini.

== See also ==
- Scientific community metaphor, an approach to programming influenced by Lakatos's work on research programmes
- List of Soviet and Eastern Bloc defectors
- Lakatos Award set up in memory of him
- Alexander Tarasov-Rodionov, author of "Shokolad" which was formative of Lakatos's early political thinking
