= Proofs and Refutations =

1976 book by Imre Lakatos

Proofs and Refutations: The Logic of Mathematical Discovery
- Author: Imre Lakatos
- Genre: Philosophy of mathematics
- Published: 1976
- ISBN: 978-0-521-29038-8

Proofs and Refutations: The Logic of Mathematical Discovery is a 1976 book by philosopher Imre Lakatos expounding his view of the progress of mathematics. The book is written as a series of Socratic dialogues involving a group of students who discuss proposed proofs of Euler's polyhedral formula. A central theme is that definitions are not carved in stone, but often have to be patched up in the light of later insights, in particular failed proofs. This gives mathematics a somewhat experimental flavour. At the end of the Introduction, Lakatos explains that his purpose is to challenge formalism in mathematics, and to show that informal mathematics grows by a logic of "proofs and refutations".

== Background ==
The 1976 book Proofs and Refutations is based on the first three chapters of his 1961 four-chapter doctoral thesis Essays in the Logic of Mathematical Discovery. But its first chapter is Lakatos's own revision of its chapter 1 that was first published as Proofs and Refutations in four parts in 1963–4 in the British Journal for the Philosophy of Science.

== Synopsis ==
Many important logical ideas are explained in the book. For example, the difference between a counterexample to a lemma (a so-called 'local counterexample') and a counterexample to the specific conjecture under attack (a 'global counterexample' to the Euler characteristic, in this case) is discussed.

Lakatos argues for a different kind of textbook, one that uses heuristic style. To the critics that say such a textbook would be too long, he replies: 'The answer to this pedestrian argument is: let us try.'

The book includes two appendices. In the first, Lakatos gives examples of the heuristic process in mathematical discovery. In the second, he contrasts the deductivist and heuristic approaches and provides heuristic analysis of some 'proof generated' concepts, including uniform convergence, bounded variation, and the Carathéodory definition of a measurable set.

The pupils in the book are named after letters of the Greek alphabet.

== Method ==
Though the book is written as a narrative, it aims to develop an actual method of investigation based upon "proofs and refutations". In Appendix I, Lakatos summarizes this method by the following list of stages:

1. Primitive conjecture.
2. Proof (a rough thought-experiment or argument, decomposing the primitive conjecture into subconjectures).
3. "Global" counterexamples (counterexamples to the primitive conjecture) emerge.
4. Proof re-examined: the "guilty lemma" to which the global counter-example is a "local" counterexample is spotted. This guilty lemma may have previously remained "hidden" or may have been misidentified. Now it is made explicit, and built into the primitive conjecture as a condition. The theorem - the improved conjecture - supersedes the primitive conjecture with the new proof-generated concept as its paramount new feature.

He goes on and gives further stages that might sometimes take place:

5. Proofs of other theorems are examined to see if the newly found lemma or the new proof-generated concept occurs in them: this concept may be found lying at cross-roads of different proofs, and thus emerge as of basic importance.
6. The hitherto accepted consequences of the original and now refuted conjecture are checked.
7. Counterexamples are turned into new examples - new fields of inquiry open up.

== Publication history ==
The 1976 book has been translated into more than 15 languages worldwide, including Chinese, Korean, Serbo-Croat and Turkish, and went into its second Chinese edition in 2007.

== Impact on teaching ==
A number of mathematics teachers have implemented Lakatos' method of proofs and refutations in the classroom, when teaching other mathematical topics. The method has been applied to the analysis and presentation of problem solving in mechanics by high school to college level students.

The Mathematical Association of America has included this book on a list of books that they consider to be "essential for undergraduate mathematics libraries".
