= Rational reconstruction =

Philosophical method

Rational reconstruction is a philosophical term with several distinct meanings. It is found in the work of Jürgen Habermas and Imre Lakatos.

== Habermas ==
For Habermas, rational reconstruction is a philosophical and linguistic method that systematically translates intuitive knowledge of rules into a logical form. In other words, it is an approach to science and philosophy which attempts to put meanings into language properly. It is a type of formal analysis that makes explicit and systematizes the universal and inescapable conditions for the possibility of certain types of phenomena. Rational reconstruction explicates the deep generative structures that give rise to and allow for particular performances, behaviours, and other symbolically pre-structured realities. It is a procedure that is intimately tied to the interpretation of reality, and can deal with an extremely broad range of questions (but not all).

Habermas sees rational reconstruction as a task appropriate for philosophy. This mode of philosophical reflection can be compared to procedures traditionally taken up in philosophy and is concerned with the questions traditionally posed.

Once it has renounced its claim to be a first science or an encyclopedia, philosophy can maintain its status within the scientific system neither by assimilating itself to particular exemplary sciences nor by the exclusive distancing of itself from science in general. Philosophy has to implicate itself in the fallibilistic self-understanding and procedural rationality of the empirical sciences; it may not lay claim to a privileged access to truth, or to a method, an object realm, or even just a style of intuition that is specifically its own. Only thus can philosophy contribute its best to a nonexclusive division of labor, namely, its persistent tenacity in posing questions universalistically, and its procedure of rationally reconstructing the intuitive pretheoretical knowledge of competently speaking, acting and judging subjects. ... This dowry recommends philosophy as an indispensable partner in the collaboration of those who are concerned with [the progress of reason, knowledge and truth]. (p. 38)

— Habermas, Jürgen: (1992) Postmetaphysical Thinking. Cambridge Massachusetts. The MIT Press.

Rational reconstruction is limited to the analysis of symbolically pre-structured realities because it does not deal with the description of reality. So, while the natural sciences generate theoretical knowledge about the general structures of an observable reality, rational reconstructions (sometimes called the reconstructive sciences) generate a theoretical knowledge of the deep structures of a reality accessible only through interpretation. It is hard to point out a phenomenon that is not in some way symbolically pre-structured, that is without some meaning to someone.

While the meaning of any phenomenon must in some way be generated, and the interpretation of symbols is dependent upon intelligence, the bestowal of meaning is not arbitrary. Rational reconstruction attempts to make clear the underlying processes that generate particular meanings. It is concerned with the deep structures of intelligence that generate the knowledge, judgments and actions of subjects as well as the meaning, import and validity of objects. Because of this, those sciences that systematically explicate the intuitive knowledge of competent subjects by reconstructing the pretheoretical know-how of certain human capabilities can be seen as representative of this procedure of rational reconstruction.

Habermas suggests along these lines that "we can distinguish between know-how, the ability of a competent subject who understands how to produce or accomplish something, and know-that, the explicit knowledge of how it is that he is able to do so" (Habermas, 1979). This should be understood in the context of rational reconstruction as two levels of the explication of meaning, two ways of understanding a symbolically pre-structured reality. The difference between the two levels is, in Habermas's terms, the content and the intuitively master rule-consciousness that allows for it, or in other terms, surface structures and deep structures. It is worth quoting Habermas at length to clarify this. Here he is discussing these two levels of analysis as applied to the interpretation of a text:

"...the understanding of content pursues the connections that link the surface structures of an incomprehensible [symbolic] formation with surface structures, of other, familiar formations. Thus, linguistic expressions can be explicated through paraphrase in the same language [etc.]…. If she cannot attain her end in this way, the interpreter may find it necessary to alter her attitude. She then exchanges the attitude of understanding content (directed towards surface structures)…for an attitude in which she focuses on the generative structures of the expressions themselves. The interpreter then attempts to explicate the meaning of a symbolic formation with the help of the rules according to which the author must have produced it….The attitude changes as soon as the interpreter tries not only to apply the intuitive knowledge of speakers but to reconstruct it. She then turns away from the surface structure of the symbolic formation….She attempts instead to peer into the symbolic formation- penetrating through the surface as it were- in order to discover the rules according to which this symbolic formation was produced…. The object of understanding is no longer the content…but the intuitive rule consciousness." (Habermas, 1979).

Furthermore, following this distinction between surface and deep structures, Habermas views the task of the reconstructive sciences as moving in two directions, horizontal and vertical. The "horizontal" direction seeks to reconstruct fundamental and important competencies, while the "vertical" direction seeks to reconstruct the (genetic) logic of the development of these competencies. So there are surface structures and deep structures related to competencies and sub-competencies, and these are teased apart and reconstructed by engaging two distinct modes of understanding symbolically pre-structured realities.

This should clarify what it is that rational reconstructions seek to accomplish. It should also be said that the results of systematized reconstructions claim to explicate "universal capabilities and not merely the particular competencies of individual groups" (Habermas, 1979). The theoretical claims of such rational reconstructions have the status of general theories of human competencies and behavior. "When the pretheoretical knowledge to be reconstructed expresses a universal capability, a general cognitive, linguistic, or interactive competence (or sub-competence), then what begins as an explication of meaning aims at the reconstruction of species competencies" (Habermas, 1979).

These kinds of rational reconstructions are notably different from the purely philosophical but comparable solutions and methods offered up as definitive answers to such issues in the past. Kant's transcendental analysis sought to deduce the categorical framework that structured and determined experience. Hegel's dialectic sought to systematize the process of knowing, fitting each stage of insight as a defined moment to be subsumed in the development of absolute knowledge. These great systems were conceived as being a-priori, inescapably generative of all experience and knowledge, and they were understood to be factual, to be the truth. Habermas sees rational reconstruction as a similar, but less grandiose, undertaking:

"Marked down in price the transcendental and dialectical modes of justification may still come in handy. All they can fairly be expected to furnish, however, is reconstructive hypotheses for use in empirical settings….[Rational reconstructions are] fallibilistic in orientation, they reject the dubious faith in philosophy's ability to do things single handedly, hoping instead that the success that has for so long eluded it might come from an auspicious matching of different theoretical fragments (Habermas, 1990a)."

Furthermore:

….[In rational reconstruction] the distinction between drawing on a-priori knowledge and drawing on a-posteriori knowledge becomes blurred. On the one hand, the rule consciousness [i.e. intuitive know-how] of competent subjects is for them an a-priori knowledge; on the other hand, the reconstruction of this calls for inquiries undertaken with empirical [methods] (Habermas, 1979).

In this respect Habermas sees those theorists whose projects represented a blend of philosophy and scientific methods as important exemplars. He identifies Freud, Durkheim, Mead, Weber, Piaget, Chomsky and Kohlberg as those who "inserted a genuinely philosophical idea like a detonator into a particular context of research…[initiating] paradigms in which a philosophical idea is present in embryo while at the same time empirical, yet universal, questions are being posed" (Habermas, 1990). These theorists approximated the ideal division of labor between philosophy and science that Habermas understands as crucial for progress to be achieved across disciplines; the human sciences in particular represent fertile ground for such cooperation.

== Lakatos ==
Lakatos distinguishes between the "internal" and "external" history of science. Internal history focuses on normative concerns and the reasons scientists can be said to have for accepting or rejecting scientific theories according to some account of the logic of science. External history, on the other hand, focuses on the contingent non-rational factors that influenced the scientific process.

== See also ==
- Communicative rationality
- Reflective equilibrium
- Universal pragmatics
