= Kaktovik Village =

Federally recognized Alaska Native tribe

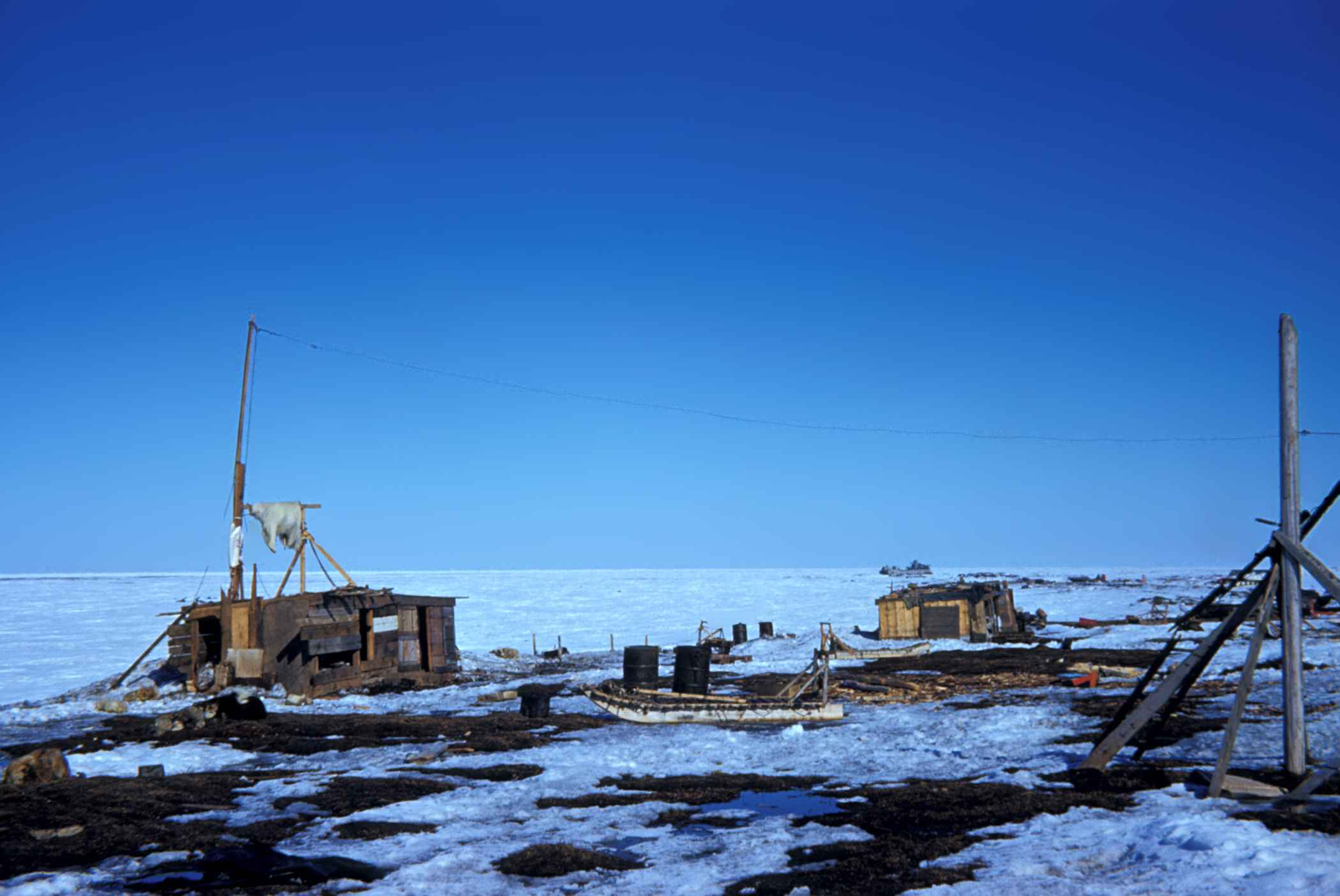
- People: Iñupiat
- Headquarters: Kaktovik, Alaska, US

Government
- Chief: Edward Rexford

Tribal Council
- Kaktovik Tribal Council

The Kaktovik Village, also known as Barter Island, is a federally recognized Iñupiat Alaska Native tribal entity.

== About ==
Kaktovik Village is headquartered in the city of Kaktovik in the North Slope Borough of Alaska. As of 2005, the tribe had 231 enrolled citizens.

American institutions hold 700 Native American remains of interest to Kaktovik Village. 23 remains and 4,900 funerary objects have been repatriated to the tribe. 21 remains were repatriated by the U.S. Department of the Interior and two remains by the Anchorage Museum at Rasmuson Center. 758 remains were repatriated by the U.S. Department of the Interior and one each by the Alaska Office of History and Archeology and the University of California, Berkeley.

== See also ==
- List of Alaska Native tribal entities
