= Audrey G. Bennett =

Design scholar

Audrey G Bennett
- Born: September 11, 1971 (age 55); Nassau, Bahamas
- Education: Yale University School of Art, Dartmouth College
- Website: audreygbennett.com

Audrey Grace Bennett (born September 11, 1971) is a Caribbean-American design professor with a joint appointment in Art and Design and Communication and Media at the University of Michigan. She was named a University Diversity and Social Transformation Professor in 2019. She studies visual communication across cultures with specific focuses on ethnocomputing, HIV, food, and health. 2019 University Diversity and Social Transformation Professor.

== Early life and academic career ==
Bennett was born in Nassau, The Bahamas. She moved with her family to Kingston, Jamaica at age three and then East Orange, New Jersey from age six through high school. She attended Dartmouth College and Yale University's School of Art.

=== Academic career ===
In 1987, Bennett joined Rensselaer Polytechnic Institute as an assistant professor, later promoted to full professor. She was named College Art Association Professional Development Fellow in 1996. In 2010 she and Ron Eglash received National Science Foundation funding to study HIV attitudes in Kenya and Ghana, combining graphic design and science. She published the book "Engendering Interaction with Images" in 2012.

Bennett joined the University of Michigan in Ann Arbor in 2018 as full professor with tenure in the Penny W. Stamps School of Art and Design, with a joint appointment in the Department of Communication and Media. In 2019, she was named a University of Social Design Professors at the University of Michigan.

Bennett is recognized for her contributions to graphic design history, such as the African roots of Swiss design. Her honors include Andrew W. Mellon Distinguished Scholar of the University of Pretoria in 2015 and Steven Heller Prize for Cultural Commentary from the American Institute of Graphic Arts in 2022.

== Selected publications ==
- Bennett, Audrey (2006-08-31). Design Studies. New York: Princeton Architectural Press. ISBN 978-1-56898-586-2.
- Eglash, Ron; Bennett, Audrey; O'donnell, Casey; Jennings, Sybillyn; Cintorino, Margaret (2006). "Culturally Situated Design Tools: Ethnocomputing from Field Site to Classroom". American Anthropologist. 108 (2): 347–362. doi:10.1525/aa.2006.108.2.347. ISSN 1548-1433.
- Eglash, Ron; Bennett, Audrey (2009). "Teaching with Hidden Capital: Agency in Children's Computational Explorations of Cornrow Hairstyles". Children, Youth and Environments. 19 (1): 58–73. doi:10.7721/chilyoutenvi.19.1.0058. ISSN 1546-2250.
- Bennett, Audrey; Vulpinari, Omar, eds. (January 2011). "ICOGRADA Design Education Manifesto". International Council of Design: 1–83.
- Bennett, Audrey (2012). Engendering Interaction with Images. Bristol: Intellect L & D E F A E. doi:10.2307/j.ctv36xvk1n. ISBN 978-1-84150-481-0.
