= Cayley configuration space =

Possible distances in a bar-joint system

In the mathematical theory of structural rigidity, the Cayley configuration space of a linkage over a set of its non-edges $F$, called Cayley parameters, is the set of distances attained by $F$ over all its frameworks, under some $l_p$-norm. In other words, each framework of the linkage prescribes a unique set of distances to the non-edges of $G$, so the set of all frameworks can be described by the set of distances attained by any subset of these non-edges. Note that this description may not be a bijection. The motivation for using distance parameters is to define a continuous quadratic branched covering from the configuration space of a linkage to a simpler, often convex, space. Hence, obtaining a framework from a Cayley configuration space of a linkage over some set of non-edges is often a matter of solving quadratic equations.

Cayley configuration spaces have a close relationship to the flattenability and combinatorial rigidity of graphs.

== Definitions ==
=== Cayley configuration space ===
Definition via linkages. Consider a linkage $(G,\delta)$, with graph $G$ and $l^p_p$-edge-length vector $\delta$ (i.e., $l_p$-distances raised to the $p^{th}$ power, for some $l_p$-norm) and a set of non-edges $F$ of $G$. The Cayley configuration space of $(G,\delta)$ over $F$ in $\mathbb{R}^d$ under the for some $l_p$-norm, denoted by $\Phi^d_{F,l_p} (G,\delta_G)$, is the set of $l^p_p$-distance vectors $\delta_F$ attained by the non-edges $F$ over all frameworks of $(G,\delta)$ in $\mathbb{R}^d$. In the presence of inequality $l^p_p$-distance constraints, i.e., an interval $[\delta_l,\delta_r]$, the Cayley configuration space $\Phi^d_{F,l_p} \left(G,[\delta^l_G,\delta^r_G]\right)$ is defined analogously. In other words, $\Phi^d_{F,l_p} (G,\delta_G)$ is the projection of the Cayley-Menger semialgebraic set, with fixed $(G,\delta)$ or $\left(G,[\delta^l_G,\delta^r_G]\right)$, onto the non-edges $F$, called the Cayley parameters.

Definition via projections of the distance cone. Consider the cone $\Phi_{n,l_p}$ of vectors of pairwise $l^p_p$-distances between $n$ points. Also consider the $d$-stratum of this cone $\Phi^d_{n,l_p}$, i.e., the subset of vectors of $l^p_p$-distances between $n$ points in $\mathbb{R}^d$. For any graph $G$, consider the projection $\Phi^d_{G,l_p}$ of $\Phi^d_{n,l_p}$ onto the edges of $G$, i.e., the set of all vectors $\delta_G$ of $l^p_p$-distances for which the linkage $(G,\delta_G)$ has a framework in $\mathbb{R}^d$. Next, for any point $\delta_G$ in $\Phi^d_{G,l_p}$ and any set of non-edges $F$ of $G$, consider the fiber of $\delta_G$ in $\Phi^d_{n,l_p}$ along the coordinates of $F$, i.e., the set of vectors $\delta_{G \cup F}$ of $l^p_p$-distances for which the linkage $(G \cup F,\delta_{G \cup F})$ has a framework in $\mathbb{R}^d$.

The Cayley configuration space $\Phi^d_{F,l_p} (G,\delta_G)$ is the projection of this fiber onto the set of non-edges $F$, i.e., the set of $l^p_p$-distances attained by the non-edges in $F$ over all frameworks of $(G,\delta_G)$ in $\mathbb{R}^d$. In the presence of inequality $l^p_p$-distance constraints, i.e., an interval $[\delta_{l,G},\delta_{r,G}]$, the Cayley configuration space $\Phi^d_{F,l_p} (G,[\delta_{l,G},\delta_{r,G}])$ is the projection of a set of fibers onto the set of non-edges $F$.

Definition via branching covers. A Cayley configuration space of a linkage in $\mathbb{R}^d$ is the base space of a branching cover whose total space is the configuration space of the linkage in $\mathbb{R}^d$.

=== Oriented Cayley configuration space ===
For a 1-dof tree-decomposable graph $G$ with base non-edge $f$, each point of a framework of a linkage $(G,\delta)$ in $\mathbb{R}^d$ under the $l_2$-norm can be placed iteratively according to an orientation vector $\sigma$, also called a realization type. The entries of $\sigma$ are local orientations of triples of points for all construction steps of the framework. A $\sigma$-oriented Cayley configuration space of $(G,\delta)$ over $f$, denoted by $\Phi^2_{f,\sigma} (G,\delta)$ is the Cayley configuration space of $(G,\delta)$ over $f$ restricted to frameworks respecting $\sigma$. In other words, for any value of $f$ in $\Phi^2_{f,\sigma} (G,\delta)$, corresponding of frameworks of $(G,\delta)$ respect $\sigma$ and are a subset of the frameworks in $\Phi^2_{f} (G,\delta)$.

=== Minimal complete Cayley vector ===
For a 1-dof tree-decomposable graph $G = (V,E)$ with low Cayley complexity on a base non-edge $f$, a minimal Cayley vector $F$ is a list of $O(|V|)$ non-edges of $G$ such that the graph $G \cup F$ is generically globally rigid.

== Properties ==
=== Single interval property ===
A pair $(G,f)$, consisting of a graph $G$ and a non-edge $f$, has the single interval property in $\mathbb{R}^d$ under some $l_p$-norm if, for every linkage $(G,\delta)$, the Cayley configuration space $\Phi^d_{f,l_p} (G,\delta)$ is a single interval.

=== Inherent convexity ===
A graph $G$ has an inherent convex Cayley configuration space in $\mathbb{R}^d$ under some $l_p$ norm if, for every partition of the edges of $G$ into $H$ and $F$ and every linkage $(H,\delta)$, the Cayley configuration space $\Phi^d_{F,l_p} (H,\delta)$ is convex.

=== Genericity with respect to convexity ===
Let $G=(V,E)$ be a graph and $F$ be a nonempty set of non-edges of $G$. Also let $r$ be a framework in $\mathbb{R}^d$ of any linkage whose constraint graph is $G$ and consider its corresponding $l^p_p$-edge-length vector $\delta_r$ in the cone $\Phi_{n,l_p}$, where $n=|V|$. As defined in Sitharam & Willoughby, the framework $r$ is generic with respect to the property of convex Cayley configuration spaces if

- There is an open neighborhood $\Omega$ of $\delta_r$ in the $d$-stratum $\Phi^d_{n,l_p}$ (corresponding to a neighborhood around $r$ of frameworks in $\mathbb{R}^d$); and
- $\Phi^d_{F,l_p} (G,\delta_r)$ is convex if and only if, for all $\delta_q \in \Omega$, $\Phi^d_{F,l_p} (G,\delta_q)$ is convex.

Theorem. Every generic framework of a graph $G$ in $\mathbb{R}^d$ has a convex Cayley configuration space over a set of non-edges $F$ if and only if every linkage $(G,\delta)$ does.

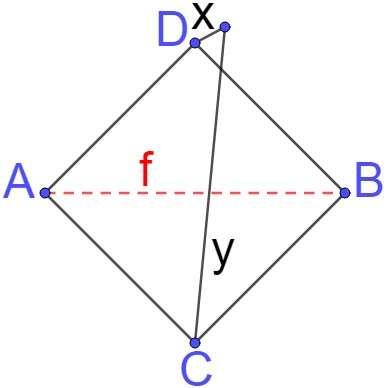
Figure 1. A graph $G$ with a non-edge $f$. There exist two frameworks in $\mathbb{R}^2$ under the $l_2$-norm that are generic with respect to convex Cayley configuration spaces over $f$ such that the distances attained by $f$ form a single interval for one framework but not for the other.

Theorem. Convexity of Cayley configuration spaces is not a generic property of frameworks.

Proof. Consider the graph in Figure 1. Also consider the framework $p$ in $\mathbb{R}^2$ whose pairwise $l_2$-distance vector $\delta_p$ assigns distance 3 to the unlabeled edges, 4 to $x$, and 1 to $y$ and the 2-dimensional framework $q$ whose pairwise $l_2$-distance vector $\delta_q$ assigns distance 3 to the unlabeled edges, 4 to $x$, and 4 to $y$. The Cayley configuration space $\Phi^2_f (G,\delta_p)$ is 2 intervals: one interval represents frameworks with vertex $B$ on the right side of the line defined by vertices $C$ and $D$ and the other interval represents frameworks with vertex $B$ on the left side of this line. The intervals are disjoint due to the triangle inequalities induced by the distances assigned to the edges $x$ and $y$. Furthermore, $p$ is a generic framework with respect to convex Cayley configuration spaces over $f$ in $\mathbb{R}^2$: there is a neighborhood of frameworks around $p$ whose Cayley configuration spaces $\Phi^2_f (G,\delta)$ are 2 intervals.

On the other hand, the Cayley configuration space $\Phi^2_f (G,\delta_q)$ is a single interval: the triangle-inequalities induced by the quadrilateral containing $f$ define a single interval that is contained in the interval defined by the triangle inequalities induced by the distances assigned to the edges $x$ and $y$. Furthermore, $q$ is a generic framework with respect to convex Cayley configuration spaces over $f$ in $\mathbb{R}^2$: there is a neighborhood of frameworks around $q$ whose Cayley configuration spaces over $f$ in $\mathbb{R}^2$ are a single interval. Thus, one generic framework has a convex Cayley configuration space while another does not.

=== Generic completeness ===
A generically complete, or just complete, Cayley configuration space is a Cayley configuration of a linkage $(G,\delta)$ over a set of non-edges $F$ such that each point in this space generically corresponds to finitely many frameworks of $(G,\delta)$ and the space has full measure. Equivalently, the graph $G \cup F$ is generically minimally-rigid.

== Results for the Euclidean norm ==
The following results are for Cayley configuration spaces of linkages over non-edges under the $l_2$-norm, also called the Euclidean norm.

=== Single interval theorems ===
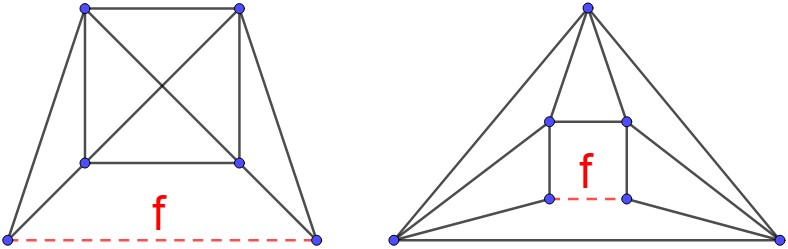
Figure 2. The graphs and their non-edges $f$ each has the single interval property in $\mathbb{R}^3$. Both graphs with $f$ added as an edge are their own minimal 2-sum components that contain $f$, but neither is 3-flattenable.

Let $G$ be a graph. Consider a 2-sum decomposition of $G$, i.e., recursively decomposing $G$ into its 2-sum components. The minimal elements of this decomposition are called the minimal 2-sum components of $G$.

Theorem. For $d \leq 2$, the pair $(G,f)$, consisting of a graph $G$ and a non-edge $f$, has the single interval property in $\mathbb{R}^d$ if and only if all minimal 2-sum components of $G \cup f$ that contain $f$ are partial 2-trees.

The latter condition is equivalent to requiring that all minimal 2-sum components of $G \cup f$ that contain $f$ are 2-flattenable, as partial 2-trees are exactly the class of 2-flattenable graphs (see results on 2-flattenability). This result does not generalize for dimensions $d \geq 3$. The forbidden minors for 3-flattenability are the complete graph $K_5$ and the 1-skeleton of the octahedron $K_{2,2,2}$ (see results on 3-flattenability). Figure 2 shows counterexamples for $d=3$. Denote the graph on the left by $G$ and the graph on the right by $H$. Both pairs $(G,f)$ and $(H,f)$ have the single interval property in $\mathbb{R}^3$: the vertices of $f$ can rotate in 3-dimensions around a plane. Also, both $G \cup f$ and $H \cup f$ are themselves minimal 2-sum components containing $f$. However, neither $G \cup f$ nor $H \cup f$ is 3-flattenable: contracting $f$ in $G \cup f$ yields $K_5$ and contracting $f$ in $H \cup f$ yields $K_{2,2,2}$.

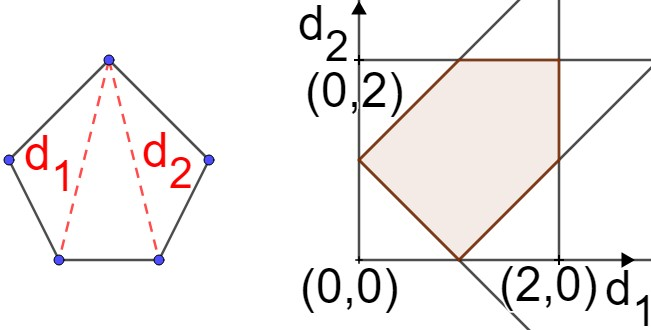
Figure 3. The graph $G$ shown left. For the linkage $\delta$ that assigns the distance 1 to the edges of $G$, the Cayley configuration space $\Phi^2_{d_1 \cup d_2,l_2} (G,\delta)$ is shown right.

Example. Consider the graph $G$ in Figure 3 whose non-edges are $d_1$ and $d_2$. The graph $G$ is its own and only minimal 2-sum component containing either non-edge. Additionally, the graph $G \cup d_1 \cup d_2$ is a 2-tree, so $G$ is a partial 2-tree. Hence, by the theorem above both pairs $(G,d_1)$ and $(G,d_2)$ have the single interval property in $\mathbb{R}^2$.

The following conjecture characterizes pairs $(G,f)$ with the single interval property in $\mathbb{R}^d$ for arbitrary $d$.

Conjecture. The pair $(G,f)$, consisting of a graph $G$ and a non-edge $f$, has the single interval property in $\mathbb{R}^d$ if and only if for any minimal 2-sum component of $G \cup f$ that contains $f$ and is not $d$-flattenable, $f$ must be either removed, duplicated, or contracted to obtain a forbidden minor for $d$-flattenability from $G$.

=== 1-dof tree-decomposable linkages in R^{2} ===
The following results concern oriented Cayley configuration spaces of 1-dof tree-decomposable linkages over some base non-edge in $\mathbb{R}^2$. Refer to tree-decomposable graphs for the definition of generic linkages used below.

Theorem. For a generic 1-dof tree-decomposable linkage $(G,\delta)$ with base non-edge $f$ the following hold:

- An oriented Cayley configuration space $\Phi^2_{f,\sigma} (G,\delta)$ is a set of disjoint closed real intervals or empty;
- Any endpoint of these closed intervals corresponds to the length of $f$ in a framework of an extreme linkage; and
- For any vertex $v$ or any non-edge $g$ of $G$, the maps from $\Phi^2_{f,\sigma} (G,\delta)$ to the coordinates of $v$ or the length of $g$ in the frameworks of $(G,\delta)$ are continuous functions on each of these closed intervals.

This theorem yields an algorithm to compute (oriented) Cayley configuration spaces of 1-dof tree-decomposable linkages over a base non-edge by simply constructing oriented frameworks of all extreme linkages. This algorithm can take time exponential in the size of the linkage and in the output Cayley configuration space. For a 1-dof tree-decomposable graph $G$, three complexity measures of its oriented Cayley configuration spaces are:

- Cayley size: the maximum number of disjoint closed real intervals in the Cayley configuration space over all linkages $(G,\delta)$;
- Cayley computational complexity: the maximum time complexity to obtain these intervals over all linkages $(G,\delta)$; and
- Cayley algebraic complexity: the maximum algebraic complexity of describing each endpoint of these intervals over all linkages $(G,\delta)$.

Bounds on these complexity measures are given in Sitharam, Wang & Gao. Another algorithm to compute these oriented Cayley configuration spaces achieves linear Cayley complexity in the size of the underlying graph.

Theorem. For a generic 1-dof tree-decomposable linkage $(G,\delta)$, where the graph $G$ has low Cayley complexity on a base non-edge $f$, the following hold:

- There exist at most two continuous motion paths between any two frameworks of $(G,\delta)$,
  - and the time complexity to find such a path, if it exists, is linear in the number of interval endpoints of the oriented Cayley configuration space over $f$ that the path contains; and
- There is an algorithm that generates the entire set of connected components of the configuration space of frameworks of $(G,\delta)$,
  - and the time complexity of generating each such component is linear in the number of interval endpoints of the oriented Cayley configuration space over $f$ that the component contains.

An algorithm is given in Sitharam, Wang & Gao to find these motion paths. The idea is to start from one framework located in one interval of the Cayley configuration space, travel along the interval to its endpoint, and jump to another interval, repeating these last two steps until the target framework is reached. This algorithm utilizes the following facts: (i) there is a continuous motion path between any two frameworks in the same interval, (ii) extreme linkages only exist at the endpoints of an interval, and (iii) during the motion, the low Cayley complexity linkage only changes its realization type when jumping to a new interval and exactly one local orientation changes sign during this jump.

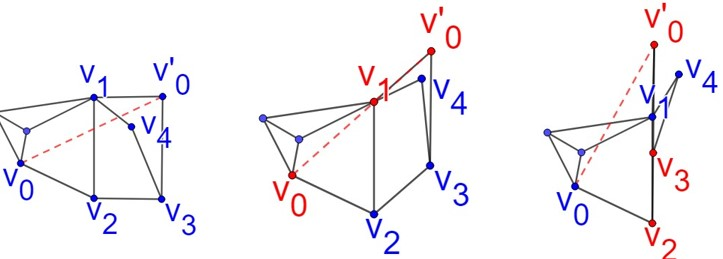
Figure 4. Three oriented frameworks, with base non-edge $(v_0,v'_0)$, along a continuous motion path. The last two frameworks are about to change orientations.

Example. Figure 4 shows an oriented framework of a 1-dof tree-decomposable linkage with base non-edge $(v_0,v'_0)$, located in an interval of the Cayley configuration space, and two other frameworks whose orientations are about to change. The vertices corresponding to construction steps are labelled in order of construction. More specifically, the first framework has the realization type $(1,-1,-1,1)$. There is a continuous motion path to the second framework, which has the realization type $(0,-1,-1,1)$. Hence, this framework corresponds to an interval endpoint and jumping to a new interval results in the realization type $(-1,-1,-1,1)$. Likewise, the third framework is corresponds to an interval endpoint with the realization type $(-1,-1,0,1)$ and jumping to a new interval results in the realization type $(-1,-1,1,1)$.

Theorem. (1) For a generic 1-path, 1-dof tree-decomposable linkage $(G,\delta)$ with low Cayley complexity, there exists a bijective correspondence between the set of frameworks of $(G,\delta)$ and points on a 2-dimensional curve, whose points are the minimum complete Cayley distance vectors. (2) For a generic 1-dof tree-decomposable linkage $(G,\delta)$ with low Cayley complexity, there exists a bijective correspondence between the set of frameworks of $(G,\delta)$ and points on an $n$-dimensional curve, whose points are the minimum complete Cayley distance vectors, where $n$ is the number of last level vertices of the graph $G$.

== Results for general p-norms ==
These results are extended to general $l_p$-norms.

Theorem. For general $l_p$-norms, a graph $G$ has an inherent convex Cayley configuration space in $\mathbb{R}^d$ if and only if $G$ is $d$-flattenable.

The "only if" direction was proved in Sitharam & Gao using the fact that the $l^2_2$ distance cone $\Phi_{n,l_2}$ is convex. As a direct consequence, $d$-flattenable graphs and graphs with inherent convex Cayley configuration spaces in $\mathbb{R}^d$ have the same forbidden minor characterization. See Graph flattenability for results on these characterizations, as well as a more detailed discussion on the connection between Cayley configuration spaces and flattenability.

Example. Consider the graph in Figure 3 with both non-edges added as edges. The resulting graph is a 2-tree, which is 2-flattenable under the $l_1$ and $l_2$ norms, see Graph flattenability. Hence, the theorem above indicates that the graph has an inherent convex Cayley configuration space in $\mathbb{R}^2$ under the $l_1$ and $l_2$ norms. In particular, the Cayley configuration space over one or both of the non-edges $d_1$ and $d_2$ is convex.

== Applications ==
The EASAL algorithm makes use of the techniques developed in Sitharam & Gao for dealing with convex Cayley configuration spaces to describe the dimensional, topological, and geometric structure of Euclidean configuration spaces in $\mathbb{R}^3$. More precisely, for two sets of $n$ points $A$ and $B$ in $\mathbb{R}^3$ with interval distance constraints between pairs of points coming from different sets, EASAL outputs all the frameworks of this linkage such that no pair of constrained points is too close together and at least one pair of constrained points is sufficiently close together. This algorithm has applications in molecular self-assembly.
