= Ron Eglash =

American professor and author

- Eglash works with children in the Yup'ik village of Akiachak, Alaska.
- Born: December 25, 1958 (age 67); Chestertown, Maryland, U.S.
- Education: University of California, Los Angeles (BS, MS); University of California, Santa Cruz (PhD)
- Known for: Ethnomathematics
- Scientific career
- Fields: Mathematics; Information technology
- Workplaces: Rensselaer Polytechnic Institute; Ohio State University

Ron Eglash (born December 25, 1958, in Chestertown, Maryland) is a professor at the University of Michigan School of Information with a secondary appointment in the Stamps School of Design. His research involves cybernetics, anthropology, and design, and he is known for his work in the field of ethnomathematics.

== Education and academic career ==
Eglash holds a bachelor's degree in cybernetics and a master's in systems engineering from the University of California, Los Angeles. He received a Ph.D. in history of consciousness from the University of California, Santa Cruz. Eglash then won a Fulbright fellowship which enabled postdoctoral field research on African ethnomathematics that he published in the book African Fractals: Modern Computing and Indigenous Design.

He has served as a senior lecturer in comparative studies at Ohio State University, and is currently a professor at the University of Michigan, Ann Arbor.

=== Research ===
Eglash studies fractal patterns in African architecture, art, and religion, and the relationships between indigenous cultures and modern technology, such as that between Native American cultural and spiritual practices and cybernetics. Eglash has also conducted studies in teaching children math and computing through simulations of indigenous and vernacular cultural practices. He explains that the simulations do not impose math externally, but rather translate the mathematical ideas already present in the cultural practices to their equivalent form in school-taught math. Examples include transformational geometry in cornrow braiding, spiral arcs in graffiti, least common multiples in percussion rhythms, and analytic geometry in Native American beadwork. His approach is one of many attempts to draw the inspiration to learn out of students' own cultural backgrounds.

He also studies social justice issues as they manifest in the practice of science and technology, ranging from the ethnic identity of “nerds” to the so-called appropriation of science and technology by groups disempowered on the basis of race, class, gender. Another branch of this research explores how the “bottom-up” egalitarian principles found in many indigenous cultures could be applied to modern society in fields from economics to political science.

== Publications ==
=== Books ===
- African Fractals: Modern Computing and Indigenous Design. New Brunswick: Rutgers University Press, 1999.
- Eglash, R., Croissant, J., Di Chiro, G., and Fouché, R. (ed). Appropriating Technology: Vernacular Science and Social Power. University of Minnesota Press, 2004.
- Eglash, Ron; Bennett, Audrey; O'donnell, Casey; Jennings, Sybillyn; Cintorino, Margaret (2006). "Culturally Situated Design Tools: Ethnocomputing from Field Site to Classroom". American Anthropologist. 108 (2): 347–362. doi:10.1525/aa.2006.108.2.347. ISSN 1548-1433.
- “Race, Sex, & Nerds": In Race, Sex, and Nerds: From Black Geeks to Asian American Hipsters, Ron Eglash is challenging the normative racial identity associated to geeks and nerds. He identifies the figure of the nerd as one typically representative of hyper-whiteness. However, as the participation of underrepresented minorities in science and technology emerges, the identity of the nerd is being redesigned so Black/Asian nerds are not viewed as making efforts to cultivate a White identity.

=== Web ===
- "Appropriating Technology". Public Sphere Project. 2008.
- "Culturally Situated Design Tools". Public Sphere Project. 2008.
