= Iñupiaq numerals =

Vigesimal numerals of Iñupiaq language

The Iñupiaq language has a vigesimal (base-20) numeral system, with words for numerals up to 20^{12} (a bit over 4 quadrillion). Numerals are built from a small number of root words and a number of compounding suffixes. The following list are the various numerals of the language, omitting only the higher derivatives ending in the suffix -utaiḷaq, which subtracts one from the value of the stem. (See Iñupiaq language#Numerals.) They are transcribed both in the vigesimal Kaktovik digits that were designed for Iñupiaq and in the decimal Hindu-Arabic digits. Apart from the subtractive suffix -utaiḷaq, which has no counterpart in Kaktovik notation, and the idiosyncratic root word itchaksrat 'six', Iñupiaq numerals are closely represented by the Kaktovik digits.

Units (n × 20^{0})
Numeral	Morphological pattern	Kaktovik notation	Hindu-Arabic notation
kisitchisaġvik	(Note: A deverbal noun. Outside of mathematics, suitchuq "none" or suitchuq X "no X" is normally used.)	𝋀	0
atausiq	1	𝋁	1
malġuk	2	𝋂	2
piŋasut	3	𝋃	3
sisamat	4	𝋄	4
tallimat	5	𝋅	5
itchaksrat	6	𝋆	6
tallimat malġuk	5 + 2	𝋇	7
tallimat piŋasut	5 + 3	𝋈	8
quliŋŋuġutaiḷaq	10 − 1	𝋉	9
qulit	10	𝋊	10
qulit atausiq	10 + 1	𝋋	11
qulit malġuk	10 + 2	𝋌	12
qulit piŋasut	10 + 3	𝋍	13
akimiaġutaiḷaq	15 − 1	𝋎	14
akimiaq	15	𝋏	15
akimiaq atausiq	15 + 1	𝋐	16
akimiaq malġuk	15 + 2	𝋑	17
akimiaq piŋasut	15 + 3	𝋒	18
iñuiññaġutaiḷaq	20 − 1	𝋓	19
iñuiññaq	20	𝋁 𝋀	20
iḷagiññaq	400	𝋁 𝋀	400

n-kipiaq (n × 20^{1})
malġukipiaq	2×20	𝋂 𝋀	40
piŋasukipiaq	3×20	𝋃 𝋀	60
sisamakipiaq	4×20	𝋄 𝋀	80
tallimakipiaq	5×20	𝋅 𝋀	100
tallimakipiaq iñuiññaq	5×20 + 20	𝋆 𝋀	120
tallimakipiaq malġukipiaq	5×20 + 2×20	𝋇 𝋀	140
tallimakipiaq piŋasukipiaq	5×20 + 3×20	𝋈 𝋀	160
tallimakipiaq sisamakipiaq	5×20 + 4×20	𝋉 𝋀	180
qulikipiaq	10×20	𝋊 𝋀	200
qulikipiaq iñuiññaq	10×20 + 20	𝋋 𝋀	220
qulikipiaq malġukipiaq	10×20 + 2×20	𝋌 𝋀	240
qulikipiaq piŋasukipiaq	10×20 + 3×20	𝋍 𝋀	260
qulikipiaq sisamakipiaq	10×20 + 4×20	𝋎 𝋀	280
akimiakipiaq	15×20	𝋏 𝋀	300
akimiakipiaq iñuiññaq	15×20 + 20	𝋐 𝋀	320
akimiakipiaq malġukipiaq	15×20 + 2×20	𝋑 𝋀	340
akimiakipiaq piŋasukipiaq	15×20 + 3×20	𝋒 𝋀	360
akimiakipiaq sisamakipiaq	15×20 + 4×20	𝋓 𝋀	380
iñuiññakipiaq (= iḷagiññaq above)	20×20 [= 20^{2}]	𝋁 𝋀	400

n-agliaq (n × 20^{2})
malġuagliaq	2×20^{2}	𝋂 𝋀	800
piŋasuagliaq	3×20^{2}	𝋃 𝋀	1,200
sisamaagliaq	4×20^{2}	𝋄 𝋀	1,600
tallimaagliaq	5×20^{2}	𝋅 𝋀	2,000
quliagliaq	10×20^{2}	𝋊 𝋀	4,000
akimiagliaq	15×20^{2}	𝋏 𝋀	6,000

n-pak (n × 20^{3})
atausiqpak	1×20^{3} [= 20^{3}]	,	8,000
malġuqpak	2×20^{3}	,	16,000
piŋasuqpak	3×20^{3}	,	24,000
sisamaqpak	4×20^{3}	,	32,000
tallimaqpak	5×20^{3}	,	40,000
quliqpak	10×20^{3}	,	80,000
akimiaqpak	15×20^{3}	,	120,000
iñuiññaqpak	20×20^{3} [= 20^{4}]	,	160,000

n-kipiaq-pak (n × 20^{4})
malġukipiaqpak	2×20×20^{3}	,	320,000
piŋasukipiaqpak	3×20×20^{3}	,	480,000
sisamakipiaqpak	4×20×20^{3}	,	640,000
tallimakipiaqpak	5×20×20^{3}	,	800,000
qulikipiaqpak	10×20×20^{3}	,	1,600,000
akimiakipiaqpak	15×20×20^{3}	,	2,400,000

n-pak (n × 20^{3})
iḷagiññaqpak	400×20^{3} [= 20^{5}]	,	3,200,000

n-agliaq-pak (n × 20^{5})
malġuagliaqpak	2×20^{2}×20^{3}	,	6,400,000
piŋasuagliaqpak	3×20^{2}×20^{3}	,	9,600,000
sisamaagliaqpak	4×20^{2}×20^{3}	,	12,800,000
tallimaagliaqpak	5×20^{2}×20^{3}	,	16,000,000
quliagliaqpak	10×20^{2}×20^{3}	,	32,000,000
akimiagliaqpak	15×20^{2}×20^{3}	,	48,000,000

n-pakaippaq (n × 20^{6})
atausiqpakaippaq	1×(20^{3})^{2} [= 20^{6}]	,,	64,000,000
malġuqpakaippaq	2×(20^{3})^{2}	,,	128,000,000
piŋasuqpakaippaq	3×(20^{3})^{2}	,,	192,000,000
sisamaqpakaippaq	4×(20^{3})^{2}	,,	256,000,000
tallimaqpakaippaq	5×(20^{3})^{2}	,,	320,000,000
quliqpakaippaq	10×(20^{3})^{2}	,,	640,000,000
akimiaqpakaippaq	15×(20^{3})^{2}	,,	960,000,000
iñuiññaqpakaippaq	20×(20^{3})^{2} [= 20^{7}]	,,	1,280,000,000

n-kipiaq-pakaippaq (n × 20^{7})
malġukipiaqpakaippaq	2×20×(20^{3})^{2}	,,	2,560,000,000
piŋasukipiaqpakaippaq	3×20×(20^{3})^{2}	,,	3,840,000,000
sisamakipiaqpakaippaq	4×20×(20^{3})^{2}	,,	5,120,000,000
tallimakipiaqpakaippaq	5×20×(20^{3})^{2}	,,	6,400,000,000
qulikipiaqpakaippaq	10×20×(20^{3})^{2}	,,	12,800,000,000
akimiakipiaqpakaippaq	15×20×(20^{3})^{2}	,,	19,200,000,000

n-pakaippaq (n × 20^{6})
iḷagiññaqpakaippaq	400×(20^{3})^{2} [= 20^{8}]	,,	25,600,000,000

n-agliaq-pakaippaq (n × 20^{8})
malġuagliaqpakaippaq	2×20^{2}×(20^{3})^{2}	,,	51,200,000,000
piŋasuagliaqpakaippaq	3×20^{2}×(20^{3})^{2}	,,	76,800,000,000
sisamaagliaqpakaippaq	4×20^{2}×(20^{3})^{2}	,,	102,400,000,000
tallimaagliaqpakaippaq	5×20^{2}×(20^{3})^{2}	,,	128,000,000,000
quliagliaqpakaippaq	10×20^{2}×(20^{3})^{2}	,,	256,000,000,000
akimiagliaqpakaippaq	15×20^{2}×(20^{3})^{2}	,,	384,000,000,000

n-pakpiŋatchaq (n × 20^{9})
atausiqpakpiŋatchaq	1×(20^{3})^{3} [= 20^{9}]	,,,	512,000,000,000
malġuqpakpiŋatchaq	2×(20^{3})^{3}	,,,	1,024,000,000,000
piŋasuqpakpiŋatchaq	3×(20^{3})^{3}	,,,	1,536,000,000,000
sisamaqpakpiŋatchaq	4×(20^{3})^{3}	,,,	2,048,000,000,000
tallimaqpakpiŋatchaq	5×(20^{3})^{3}	,,,	2,560,000,000,000
quliqpakpiŋatchaq	10×(20^{3})^{3}	,,,	5,120,000,000,000
akimiaqpakpiŋatchaq	15×(20^{3})^{3}	,,,	7,680,000,000,000
iñuiññaqpakpiŋatchaq	20×(20^{3})^{3} [= 20^{10}]	,,,	10,240,000,000,000

n-kipiaq-pakpiŋatchaq (n × 20^{10})
malġukipiaqpakpiŋatchaq	2×20×(20^{3})^{3}	,,,	20,480,000,000,000
piŋasukipiaqpakpiŋatchaq	3×20×(20^{3})^{3}	,,,	30,720,000,000,000
sisamakipiaqpakpiŋatchaq	4×20×(20^{3})^{3}	,,,	40,960,000,000,000
tallimakipiaqpakpiŋatchaq	5×20×(20^{3})^{3}	,,,	51,200,000,000,000
qulikipiaqpakpiŋatchaq	10×20×(20^{3})^{3}	,,,	102,400,000,000,000
akimiakipiaqpakpiŋatchaq	15×20×(20^{3})^{3}	,,,	153,600,000,000,000

n-pakpiŋatchaq (n × 20^{9})
iḷagiññaqpakpiŋatchaq	400×(20^{3})^{3} [= 20^{11}]	,,,	204,800,000,000,000

n-agliaq-pakpiŋatchaq (n × 20^{11})
malġuagliaqpakpiŋatchaq	2×20^{2}×(20^{3})^{3}	,,,	409,600,000,000,000
piŋasuagliaqpakpiŋatchaq	3×20^{2}×(20^{3})^{3}	,,,	614,400,000,000,000
sisamaagliaqpakpiŋatchaq	4×20^{2}×(20^{3})^{3}	,,,	819,200,000,000,000
tallimaagliaqpakpiŋatchaq	5×20^{2}×(20^{3})^{3}	,,,	1,024,000,000,000,000
quliagliaqpakpiŋatchaq	10×20^{2}×(20^{3})^{3}	,,,	2,048,000,000,000,000
akimiagliaqpakpiŋatchaq	15×20^{2}×(20^{3})^{3}	,,,	3,072,000,000,000,000
iñuiññagliaqpakpiŋatchaq	20×20^{2}×(20^{3})^{3} [= 20^{12}]	,,,,	4,096,000,000,000,000
