= Plane symmetry =

A plane symmetry is a symmetry of a pattern in the Euclidean plane: that is, a transformation of the plane that carries any direction lines to lines and preserves many different distances. If one has a pattern in the plane, the set of plane symmetries that preserve the pattern forms a group. The groups that arise in this way are plane symmetry groups and are of considerable mathematical interest.

There are several kinds of plane symmetry groups:

- Reflection groups. These are plane symmetry groups that are generated by reflections, possibly limited to reflections in lines through the origin.
- Rotation groups. These groups consist of rotations around a point.
- Translation groups.
- Symmetries of geometrical figures. Some of these are reflection groups, e.g., the group of symmetries of the square or the rectangle. The symmetry group of the flag of Hong Kong or any similar figure without an axis of symmetry is a rotation group.
