= Kaktovik Numerals (Unicode block) =

- Range: U+1D2C0..U+1D2DF (32 code points)
- Plane: SMP
- Scripts: Common
- Symbol sets: Kaktovik numerals
- Assigned: 20 code points
- Unused: 12 reserved code points

Unicode version history
- Latest change: Version 15.0
- 15.0 (2022): 20 (+20)

Unicode documentation
- Code chart ∣ Web page

The Kaktovik Numerals are a Unicode block for the Kaktovik numerals, a base-20 system of numerical digits created by Alaskan Iñupiaq. It was first encoded in Unicode version 15 in 2022. It contains 20 characters for representing each of the digits 0-19 in the base-20 place value numeral system of Iñupiaq and related Inuit, Yupik, and Unangan languages.

Kaktovik Numerals^{[1]}^{[2]} Official Unicode Consortium code chart (PDF)
	0	1	2	3	4	5	6	7	8	9	A	B	C	D	E	F
U+1D2Cx	𝋀	𝋁	𝋂	𝋃	𝋄	𝋅	𝋆	𝋇	𝋈	𝋉	𝋊	𝋋	𝋌	𝋍	𝋎	𝋏
U+1D2Dx	𝋐	𝋑	𝋒	𝋓												
Notes: 1. As of Unicode version 16.0; 2. Grey areas indicate non-assigned code points

== History ==
The following Unicode-related documents record the purpose and process of defining specific characters in the Kaktovik Numerals block:

Version	Final code points (Note: Proposed code points and characters names may differ from final code points and names)	Count	L2 ID	Document
15.0	U+1D2C0..1D2D3	20	L2/20-070	Silva, Eduardo Marín (2020-02-09), Exploratory proposal to encode the Kaktovik numerals
15.0	U+1D2C0..1D2D3	20	L2/20-105	Anderson, Deborah; Whistler, Ken; Pournader, Roozbeh; Moore, Lisa; Constable, Peter; Liang, Hai (2020-04-20), "14. Kaktovik Numerals", Recommendations to UTC #163 April 2020 on Script Proposals
15.0	U+1D2C0..1D2D3	20	L2/20-102	Moore, Lisa (2020-05-06), "Action Item 163-A59: Allocate U+1D250..U+1D26F for Kaktovik Numbers.", UTC #163 Minutes
15.0	U+1D2C0..1D2D3	20	L2/20-262	Silva, Eduardo Marín (2020-08-24), Request to move the tentative location of Kaktovik numerals on the roadmap
15.0	U+1D2C0..1D2D3	20	L2/20-250	Anderson, Deborah; Whistler, Ken; Pournader, Roozbeh; Moore, Lisa; Constable, Peter; Liang, Hai (2020-10-01), "20. Kaktovik Numerals", Recommendations to UTC #165 October 2020 on Script Proposals
15.0	U+1D2C0..1D2D3	20	L2/21-058R	Silva, Eduardo Marín; Miller, Kirk; Strand, Catherine (2021-04-29), Unicode request for Kaktovik numerals
15.0	U+1D2C0..1D2D3	20	L2/21-073	Anderson, Deborah; Whistler, Ken; Pournader, Roozbeh; Moore, Lisa; Liang, Hai (2021-04-23), "16. Kaktovik Numerals", Recommendations to UTC #167 April 2021 on Script Proposals
15.0	U+1D2C0..1D2D3	20	L2/21-066	Moore, Lisa (2021-05-05), "Consensus 167-C7", UTC #167 Minutes
