= Informal mathematics =

Any informal mathematical practices used in everyday life

Informal mathematics, also called naïve mathematics, has historically been the predominant form of mathematics at most times and in most cultures, and is the subject of modern ethno-cultural studies of mathematics. The philosopher Imre Lakatos in his Proofs and Refutations aimed to sharpen the formulation of informal mathematics, by reconstructing its role in nineteenth century mathematical debates and concept formation, opposing the predominant assumptions of mathematical formalism. Informality may not discern between statements given by inductive reasoning (as in approximations which are deemed "correct" merely because they are useful), and statements derived by deductive reasoning.

== Terminology ==
Informal mathematics means any informal mathematical practices, as used in everyday life, or by aboriginal or ancient peoples, without historical or geographical limitation. Modern mathematics, exceptionally from that point of view, emphasizes formal and strict proofs of all statements from given axioms. This can usefully be called therefore formal mathematics. Informal practices are usually understood intuitively and justified with examples—there are no axioms. This is of direct interest in anthropology and psychology: it casts light on the perceptions and agreements of other cultures. It is also of interest in developmental psychology as it reflects a naïve understanding of the relationships between numbers and things. Another term used for informal mathematics is folk mathematics, which is ambiguous; the mathematical folklore article is dedicated to the usage of that term among professional mathematicians.

The field of naïve physics is concerned with similar understandings of physics. People use mathematics and physics in everyday life, without really understanding (or caring) how mathematical and physical ideas were historically derived and justified.

== History ==
There has long been a standard account of the development of geometry in ancient Egypt, followed by Greek mathematics and the emergence of deductive logic. The modern sense of the term mathematics, as meaning only those systems justified with reference to axioms, is however an anachronism if read back into history. Several ancient societies built impressive mathematical systems and carried out complex calculations based on proofless heuristics and practical approaches. Mathematical facts were accepted on a pragmatic basis. Empirical methods, as in science, provided the justification for a given technique. Commerce, engineering, calendar creation and the prediction of eclipses and stellar progression were practiced by ancient cultures on at least three continents.

== See also ==
- Ethnomathematics
- Folk psychology
- Mathematical Platonism
- Numeracy
- Pseudomathematics
