= Ethnomathematics =

Study of mathematics and culture

In mathematics education, ethnomathematics is the study of the relationship between mathematics and culture. Often associated with "cultures without written expression", it may also be defined as "the mathematics which is practised among identifiable cultural groups". It refers to a broad cluster of ideas ranging from distinct numerical and mathematical systems to multicultural mathematics education. The goal of ethnomathematics is to contribute both to the understanding of culture and the understanding of mathematics, and mainly to lead to an appreciation of the connections between the two.

== Development and meaning ==
The term "ethnomathematics" was introduced by Brazilian educator and mathematician Ubiratan D'Ambrosio in 1977 during a presentation for the American Association for the Advancement of Science. Since D'Ambrosio put forth the term, there has been debate as to its precise definition.).

The following is a sampling of some of the definitions of ethnomathematics proposed between 1985 and 2006:

- "The mathematics which is practiced among identifiable cultural groups such as national-tribe societies, labour groups, children of certain age brackets and professional classes".
- "The mathematics implicit in each practice".
- "The study of mathematical ideas of a non-literate culture".
- "The codification which allows a cultural group to describe, manage and understand reality".
- "Mathematics…is conceived as a cultural product which has developed as a result of various activities".
- "The study and presentation of mathematical ideas of traditional peoples".
- "Any form of cultural knowledge or social activity characteristic of a social group and/or cultural group that can be recognized by other groups such as Western anthropologists, but not necessarily by the group of origin, as mathematical knowledge or mathematical activity".
- "The mathematics of cultural practice".
- "The investigation of the traditions, practices and mathematical concepts of a subordinated social group".
- "I have been using the word ethnomathematics as modes, styles, and techniques (tics) of explanation, of understanding, and of coping with the natural and cultural environment (mathema) in distinct cultural systems (ethnos)".
- "What is the difference between ethnomathematics and the general practice of creating a mathematical model of a cultural phenomenon (e.g., the "mathematical anthropology" of Paul Kay [1971] and others)? The essential issue is the relation between intentionality and epistemological status. A single drop of water issuing from a watering can, for example, can be modeled mathematically, but we would not attribute knowledge of that mathematics to the average gardener. Estimating the increase in seeds required for an increased garden plot, on the other hand, would qualify".
- "N.C. Ghosh included Ethnomathematics in the list of Folk Mathematics" Vide : Lokdarpan- a Journal of the Department of Folklore, Kalyani University and Rabindra Bharati Patrika- a Journal of Rabindra Bharati University, Kolkata, India. Lokashruti - a Journal of Govt. of West Bengal, India.

== Areas ==
=== Numerals and naming systems ===
==== Numerals ====
Some of the systems for representing numbers in previous and present cultures are well known. Roman numerals use a few letters of the alphabet to represent numbers up to the thousands, but are not intended for arbitrarily large numbers and can only represent positive integers. Arabic numerals are a family of systems, originating in India and passing to medieval Islamic civilization, then to Europe, and now standard in global culture—and having undergone many curious changes with time and geography—can represent arbitrarily large numbers and have been adapted to negative numbers, fractions, and real numbers.

Less well known systems include some that are written and can be read today, such as the Hebrew and Greek method of using the letters of the alphabet, in order, for digits 1–9, tens 10–90, and hundreds 100–900.

A completely different system is that of the quipu, which recorded numbers on knotted strings.

Ethnomathematicians are interested in the ways in which numeration systems grew up, as well as their similarities and differences and the reasons for them. The great variety in ways of representing numbers is especially intriguing.

==== Names for numbers ====
This means the ways in which number words are formed.

===== English =====
For instance, in English, there are four different systems. The units words (one to nine) and ten are special. The next two are reduced forms of Anglo-Saxon "one left over" and "two left over" (i.e., after counting to ten). Multiples of ten from "twenty" to "ninety" are formed from the units words, one through nine, by a single pattern. Thirteen to nineteen are compounded from tens and units words in one way, and the non-multiples of ten from twenty-one to ninety-nine are compounded from tens and units words in a different way. Larger numbers are also formed on a base of ten and its powers ("hundred" and "thousand"). One may suspect this is based on an ancient tradition of finger counting. Residues of ancient counting by 20s and 12s are the words "score", "dozen", and "gross". (Larger number words like "million" are not part of the original English system; they are scholarly creations based ultimately on Latin.). There were historical inconsistencies in the way the term "billion" was used between American English and British English. These have since been reconciled, and modern English speakers universally refer to 1,000,000,000 as 'one billion'.

===== German =====
The German language and Dutch language counts similarly to English, but the unit is placed before the tens in numbers over 20. For example, "26" is "sechsundzwanzig", literally "six and twenty". This system was formerly common in English, as seen in an artifact from the English nursery rhyme "Sing a Song of Sixpence": Sing a song of sixpence, / a pocket full of rye. / Four and twenty blackbirds, / baked in a pie. It persists in some children's songs such as "One and Twenty."

===== French =====
In the French language as used in France, one sees some differences. Soixante-dix (literally, "sixty-ten") is used for "seventy". The words "quatre-vingt" (literally, "four-twenty", or 80) and "quatre-vingt-dix" (literally, "four-twenty ten" 90) are based on 20 ("vingt") instead of 10. Swiss French and Belgian French do not use these forms, preferring more standard Latinate forms: septante for 70, huitante (formerly octante) for 80 (only in Swiss French) and nonante for 90.

===== Welsh =====
Counting in Welsh combines the vigesimal system (counting in twenties) with some other features. The following system is optional for cardinal numbers nowadays, but mandatory for ordinal numbers.

Examples of numbers in Welsh
14	pedwar ar ddeg	four upon ten
15	pymtheg	five-ten
16	un ar bymtheg	one on five-ten
20	ugain	score
37	dau ar bymtheg ar hugain	two on five-ten on score
57	hanner cant a saith	half hundred and seven
77	dau ar bymtheg a thrigain	two on five-ten and three-score
99	cant namyn un	hundred less one

===== Chinese =====
Number words in Chinese are assembled from the words for "one" through "nine" and words for powers of ten.

For example, what is in English written out as "twelve thousand three hundred forty five" is "一万二千三百四十五" (simplified) / "一萬二千三百四十五" (traditional) whose characters translate to "one ten-thousand two thousand three hundred four ten five".

===== Mesopotamia =====
In ancient Mesopotamia, the base for constructing numbers was 60, with 10 used as an intermediate base for numbers below 60.

===== West Africa =====
Many West African languages generally base their number words on a combination of 5 and 20, derived from thinking of a complete hand or a complete set of digits comprising both fingers and toes. In fact, in some languages, the words for 5 and 20 refer to these body parts. The words for numbers below 20 are based on 5 and higher numbers combine the lower numbers with multiples and powers of 20.

==== Finger counting ====
Many systems of finger counting have been, and still are, used in various parts of the world. Most are not as obvious as holding up a number of fingers. The position of fingers may be most important. One continuing use for finger counting is for people who speak different languages to communicate prices in the marketplace.

In contrast to finger counting, the Yuki people (indigenous Americans from Northern California) keep count by using the four spaces between their fingers rather than the fingers themselves. This is known as an octal (base-8) counting system.

=== The history of mathematics ===
This area of ethnomathematics mainly focuses on addressing Eurocentrism by countering the common belief that most worthwhile mathematics known and used today was developed in the Western world.

The area stresses that "the history of mathematics has been oversimplified", and seeks to explore the emergence of mathematics from various ages and civilizations throughout human history.

==== Some examples and major contributors ====
D'Ambrosio's 1980 review of the evolution of mathematics, his 1985 appeal to include ethnomathematics in the history of mathematics and his 2002 paper about the historiographical approaches to non-Western mathematics are excellent examples. Additionally, Frankenstein and Powell's 1989 attempt to redefine mathematics from a non-eurocentric viewpoint and Anderson's 1990 concepts of world mathematics are strong contributions to this area. Detailed examinations of the history of the mathematical developments of non-European civilizations, such as the mathematics of ancient Japan, Iraq, Egypt, and of Islamic, Hebrew, and Incan civilizations, have also been presented.

=== The philosophy and cultural nature of mathematics ===
The core of any debate about the cultural nature of mathematics will ultimately lead to an examination of the nature of mathematics itself. One of the oldest and most controversial topics in this area is whether mathematics is internal or external, tracing back to the arguments of Plato, an externalist, and Aristotle, an internalist. On the one hand, Internalists such as Bishop, Stigler and Baranes, believe mathematics to be a cultural product. On the other hand, externalists, like Barrow, Chevallard and Penrose, see mathematics as culture-free, and tend to be major critics of ethnomathematics. With disputes about the nature of mathematics, come questions about the nature of ethnomathematics, and the question of whether ethnomathematics is part of mathematics or not. Barton, who has offered the core of research about ethnomathematics and philosophy, asks whether "ethnomathematics is a precursor, parallel body of knowledge or precolonized body of knowledge" to mathematics and if it is even possible for us to identify all types of mathematics based on a Western-epistemological foundation.

=== Political math ===
The contributions in this area try to illuminate how mathematics has affected the nonacademic areas of society. One of the most controversial and provocative political components of ethnomathematics is its racial implications. Ethnomathematicians purport that the prefix "ethno" should not be taken as relating to race, but rather, the cultural traditions of groups of people. However, in places like South Africa concepts of culture, ethnicity and race are not only intertwined but carry strong, divisive negative connotations. So, although it may be made explicit that ethnomathematics is not a "racist doctrine" it is vulnerable to association with racism.

Another major facet of this area addresses the relationship between gender and mathematics. This looks at topics such as discrepancies between male and female math performance in educations and career-orientation, societal causes, women's contributions to mathematics research and development, etc.

==== Some examples and major contributors ====
Paulus Gerdes' writings about how mathematics can be used in the school systems of Mozambique and South Africa, and D'Ambrosio's 1990 discussion of the role mathematics plays in building a democratic and just society are examples of the impact mathematics can have on developing the identity of a society. In 1990, Bishop also writes about the powerful and dominating influence of Western mathematics. More specific examples of the political impact of mathematics are seen in Knijik's 1993 study of how Brazilian sugar cane farmers could be politically and economically armed with mathematics knowledge, and Osmond's analysis of an employer's perceived value of mathematics (2000).

=== The mathematics of different cultures ===
The focus of this area is to introduce the mathematical ideas of people who have generally been excluded from discussions of formal, academic mathematics. The research of the mathematics of these cultures indicates two, slightly contradictory viewpoints. The first supports the objectivity of mathematics and that it is something discovered not constructed. The studies reveal that all cultures have basic counting, sorting and deciphering methods, and that these have arisen independently in different places around the world. This can be used to argue that these mathematical concepts are being discovered rather than created. However, others emphasize that the usefulness of mathematics is what tends to conceal its cultural constructs. Naturally, it is not surprising that extremely practical concepts such as numbers and counting have arisen in all cultures. The universality of these concepts, however, seems harder to sustain as more and more research reveals practices which are typically mathematical, such as counting, ordering, sorting, measuring and weighing, done in radically different ways (see Section 2.1: Numerals and Naming Systems).

One of the challenges faced by researchers in this area is the fact that they are limited by their own mathematical and cultural frameworks. The discussions of the mathematical ideas of other cultures recast these into a Western framework in order to identify and understand them. This raises the questions of how many mathematical ideas evade notice simply because they lack similar Western mathematical counterparts, and of how to draw the line classifying mathematical from non-mathematical ideas.

==== Some examples and major contributors ====
The majority of research in this area has been about the intuitive mathematical thinking of small-scale, traditional, indigenous cultures, including Aboriginal Australians, the indigenous people of Liberia, Native Americans in North America, Pacific Islanders, Brazilian construction foremen, and various tribes in Africa.

==== Games of skill ====
An enormous variety of games that can be analyzed mathematically have been played around the world and through history. The interest of the ethnomathematician usually centers on the ways in which the game represents informal mathematical thought as part of ordinary society, but sometimes has extended to mathematical analyses of games. It does not include the careful analysis of good play—but it may include the social or mathematical aspects of such analysis.

A mathematical game that is well known in European culture is tic-tac-toe (noughts-and-crosses). This is a geometrical game played on a 3-by-3 square; the goal is to form a straight line of three of the same symbol. There are many broadly similar games from all parts of England, to name only one country where they are found.

Another kind of geometrical game involves objects that move or jump over each other within a specific shape (a "board"). There may be captures. The goal may be to eliminate the opponent's pieces, or simply to form a certain configuration, e.g., to arrange the objects according to a rule. One such game is nine men's morris; it has innumerable relatives where the board or setup or moves may vary, sometimes drastically. This kind of game is well suited to play out of doors with stones on the dirt, though now it may use plastic pieces on a paper or wooden board.

A mathematical game found in West Africa is to draw a certain figure by a line that never ends until it closes the figure by reaching the starting point (in mathematical terminology, this is a Eulerian path on a graph). Children use sticks to draw these in the dirt or sand, and of course the game can be played with pen and paper.

The games of checkers, chess, oware (and other mancala games), and Go may also be viewed as subjects for ethnomathematics.

==== Mathematics in folk art ====
One way mathematics appears in art is through symmetries. Woven designs in cloth or carpets (to name two) commonly have some kind of symmetrical arrangement. A rectangular carpet often has rectangular symmetry in the overall pattern. A woven cloth may exhibit one of the seventeen kinds of plane symmetry groups; see Crowe (2004) for an illustrated mathematical study of African weaving patterns. Several types of patterns discovered by ethnomathematical communities are related to technologies; see Berczi (2002) about illustrated mathematical study of patterns and symmetry in Eurasia. Following the analysis of Indonesian folk weaving patterns and Batak traditional architectural ornaments, the geometry of Indonesian traditional motifs of batik is analyzed by Hokky Situngkir that eventually made a new genre of fractal batik designs as generative art; see Situngkir and Surya (2007) for implementations.

=== Mathematics education ===
Ethnomathematics and mathematics education addresses first, how cultural values can affect teaching, learning and curriculum, and second, how mathematics education can then affect the political and social dynamics of a culture. One of the stances taken by many educators is that it is crucial to acknowledge the cultural context of mathematics students by teaching culturally based mathematics that students can relate to. Can teaching math through cultural relevance and personal experiences help the learners know more about reality, culture, society and themselves? Robert (2006)

Another approach suggested by mathematics educators is exposing students to the mathematics of a variety of different cultural contexts, often referred to as multicultural math. This can be used both to increase the social awareness of students and offer alternative methods of approaching conventional mathematics operations, like multiplication (Andrew, 2005).

==== Examples ====
Various mathematics educators have explored ways of bringing together culture and mathematics in the classroom, such as: Barber and Estrin (1995) and Bradley (1984) on Native American education, Gerdes (1988b and 2001) with suggestions for using African art and games, Malloy (1997) about African American students and Flores (1997), who developed instructional strategies for Hispanic students.

== Criticism ==
Some critics claim that mathematics education unduly emphasizes ethnomathematics in order to promote multiculturalism while spending too little time on core mathematical content, and that this often results in pseudoscience being taught. Richard Askey examined Focus on Algebra (an Addison-Wesley textbook criticized in an op-ed by Marianne M. Jennings) and among other shortcomings found it guilty of repeating debunked claims about Dogon astronomy.

More recently, curriculum changes proposed by the Seattle school district drew criticism to ethnomathematics. Some people judged the proposed changes, which involved a framework for blending math and ethnic studies, for incorporating questions like "How important is it to be right?" and "Who gets to say if an answer is right?"

== See also ==
- Anti-racist mathematics
- Cultural imperialism
- Culturally relevant teaching
- Critical pedagogy
- Ethnocomputing
- Informal mathematics
- Multiculturalism
- Pedagogy of the Oppressed
- Postmodernity
- Pseudoscience
- Social progressivism
- Teaching for social justice
- Mathematics and arts
