= Kaktovik, Alaska =

Kaktovik, Alaska Qaaktuġvik
- City
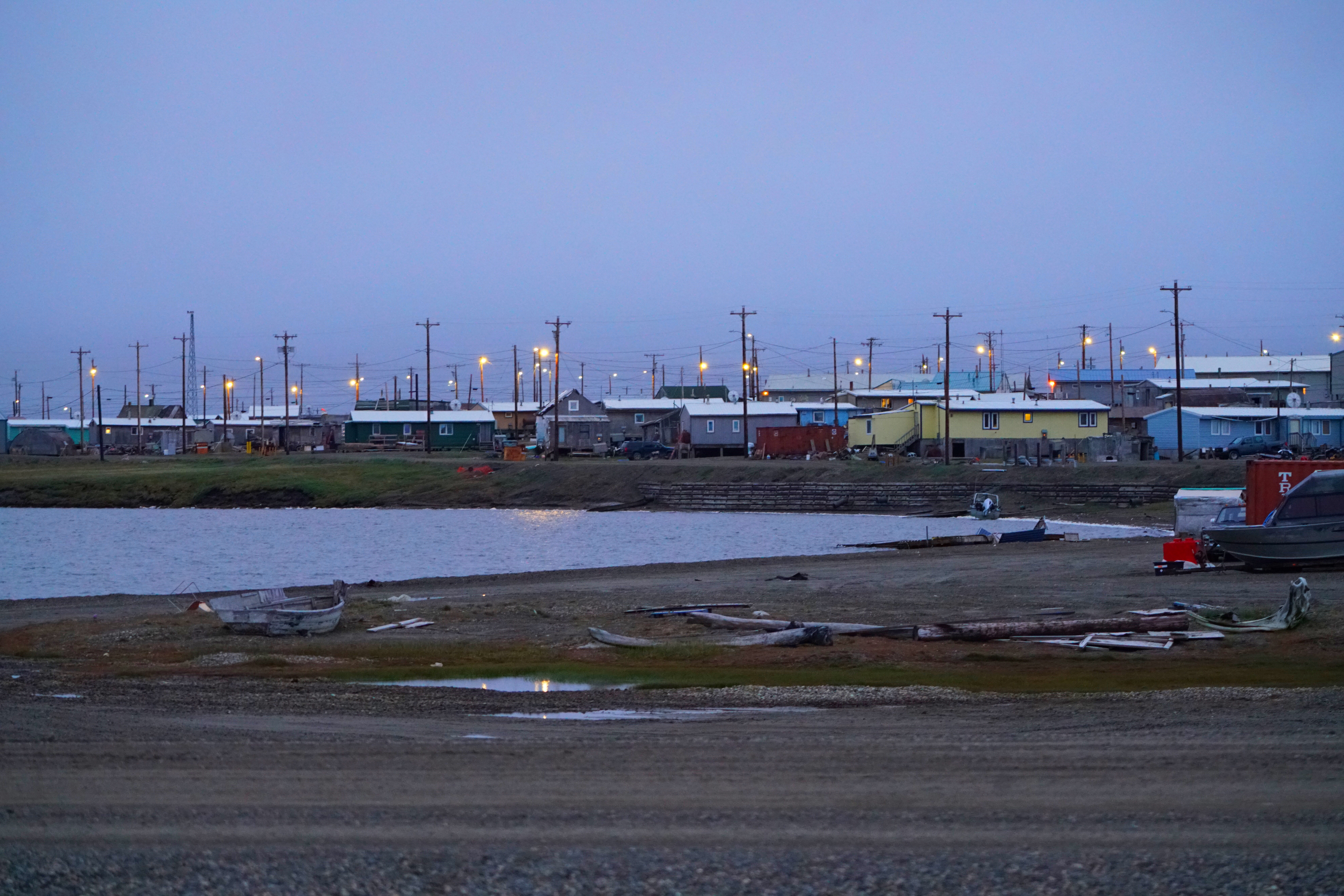
- Kaktovik in 2018

- Seal

- Location in the state of Alaska
- Coordinates: 70°07′58″N 143°36′58″W
- Country: United States
- State: Alaska
- Borough: North Slope
- Incorporated: March 26, 1971

Government
  - Mayor: Nathan Gordon, Jr.
  - State senator: Donny Olson (D)
  - State rep.: Robyn Burke (D)

Area
  - Total: 1.05 sq mi (2.71 km^{2})
  - Land: 0.78 sq mi (2.01 km^{2})
  - Water: 0.27 sq mi (0.70 km^{2})
- Elevation: 36 ft (11 m)

Population (2020)
  - Total: 283
  - Density: 365.5/sq mi (141.12/km^{2})
- Time zone: UTC-9 (Alaska (AKST))
  - Summer (DST): UTC-8 (AKDT)
- ZIP code: 99747
- Area code: 907
- FIPS code: 02-36990
- GNIS feature ID: 1404349, 2419404
- Website: City of Kaktovik

Kaktovik (/kækˈtoʊvɪk/; Inupiaq: Qaaktuġvik, IPA: [qaːktoʁvik]) is a city in North Slope Borough, Alaska, United States. The population was 283 at the 2020 census.

== History ==
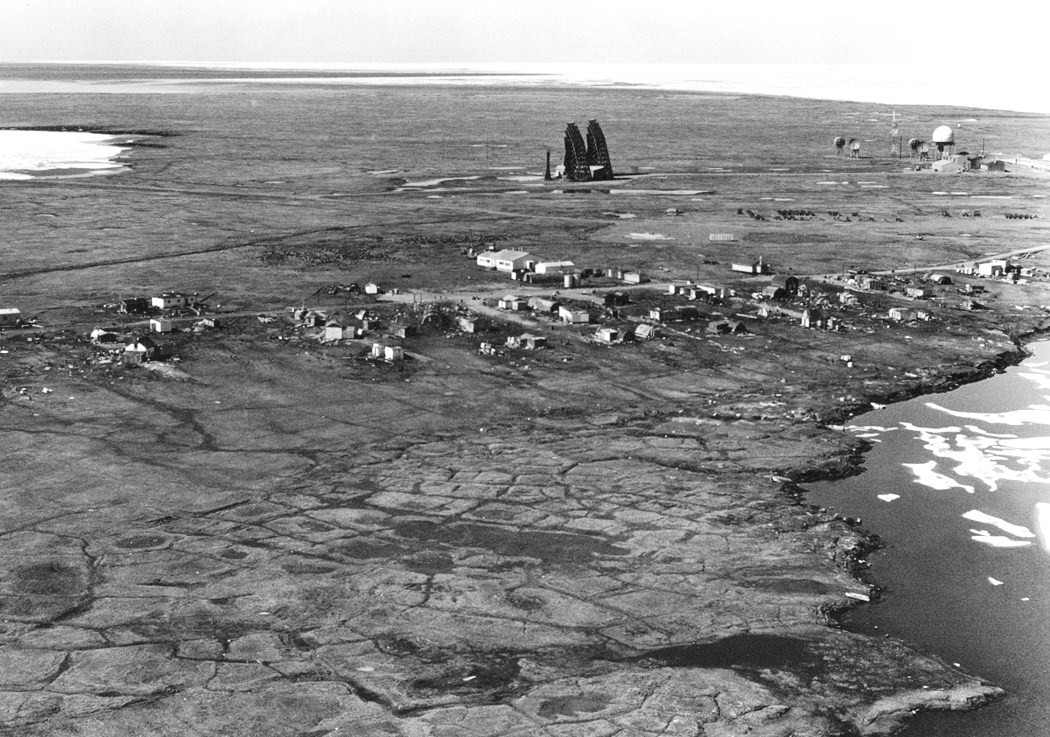
Historical aerial view of Kaktovik and Barter Island LRRS

Until the late nineteenth century, Barter Island was a major trade center for the Inupiat and was especially important as a bartering place for Inupiat from Alaska and Inuit from Canada.

Kaktovik was a traditional fishing place—Kaktovik means "Place to Seine Greyling Whitefish"—that has a large pond of good fresh water on high ground. It had no permanent settlers until people from other parts of Barter Island and northern Alaska moved to the area around the construction of a runway and Distant Early Warning Line station in the 1950s. The area was incorporated as the City of Kaktovik in 1971.

Due to Kaktovik's isolation, the village has maintained its Inupiat Eskimo traditions. Subsistence is highly dependent upon the hunting of caribou and whale.

In the early twenty-first century, Kaktovik became a tourist destination to view polar bears. This is in part due to the Inupiat, who are permitted to kill three bowhead whales per year, leaving the carcasses on the beach at the edge of town after flensing.

== Geography ==
Kaktovik is located at 70°7′58″N 143°36′58″W (70.132832, -143.616230).

Kaktovik is on the north shore of Barter Island, between the Okpilak River and Jago River on the Beaufort Sea coast. It lies in the 19.6-million-acre (79,000 km^{2}) Arctic National Wildlife Refuge.

According to the United States Census Bureau, the city has a total area of 1.0 square mile (2.6 km^{2}), of which, 0.8 square miles (2.1 km^{2}) of it is land and 0.2 square miles (0.52 km^{2}) of it (21.00%) is water.

== Transportation ==
Barter Island LRRS Airport is located near the city.

== Climate ==
Being located at 70°N, Kaktovik experiences a Tundra climate (Köppen ET). Winters are long, very cold and owing to its high latitude the sun does not rise above the horizon leaving only twilight as the source of light during mid-winter. Summers on the other hand are cool, typical of the North Slope of Alaska. The midnight sun occurs a few weeks in the spring and summer every year. Precipitation totals are similar to desert regions as only about 4 inches with most of it falling from July to September. While snowfall is more common in the colder months, it can still fall in the summer, which is still cold, as well.

Climate data for Kaktovik, Alaska 1992-2021
Month	Jan	Feb	Mar	Apr	May	Jun	Jul	Aug	Sep	Oct	Nov	Dec	Year
Record high °F (°C)	39 (4)	37 (3)	36 (2)	43 (6)	52 (11)	68 (20)	78 (26)	74 (23)	66 (19)	46 (8)	35 (2)	24 (−4)	78 (26)
Mean maximum °F (°C)	21 (−6)	17 (−8)	20 (−7)	33 (1)	45 (7)	57 (14)	68 (20)	63 (17)	52 (11)	40 (4)	28 (−2)	22 (−6)	71 (22)
Mean daily maximum °F (°C)	−5.0 (−20.6)	−5.0 (−20.6)	−1 (−18)	14 (−10)	31 (−1)	43 (6)	52 (11)	48 (9)	38 (3)	26 (−3)	11 (−12)	1 (−17)	21.1 (−6.1)
Daily mean °F (°C)	−11 (−24)	−11.5 (−24.2)	−9 (−23)	6.5 (−14.2)	26 (−3)	38 (3)	46 (8)	43 (6)	34.5 (1.4)	21 (−6)	5.5 (−14.7)	−6.5 (−21.4)	15.2 (−9.3)
Mean daily minimum °F (°C)	−17 (−27)	−18 (−28)	−17 (−27)	−1 (−18)	21 (−6)	33 (1)	40 (4)	38 (3)	31 (−1)	16 (−9)	−1 (−18)	−12 (−24)	9 (−12)
Mean minimum °F (°C)	−38 (−39)	−39 (−39)	−36 (−38)	−20 (−29)	5 (−15)	25 (−4)	31 (−1)	29 (−2)	19 (−7)	−6 (−21)	−20 (−29)	−33 (−36)	−42.8 (−41.6)
Record low °F (°C)	−54 (−48)	−59 (−51)	−51 (−46)	−44 (−42)	−16 (−27)	13 (−11)	24 (−4)	20 (−7)	4 (−16)	−26 (−32)	−51 (−46)	−51 (−46)	−59 (−51)
Average precipitation inches (mm)	0.13 (3.3)	0.20 (5.1)	0.17 (4.3)	0.15 (3.8)	0.28 (7.1)	0.47 (12)	0.53 (13)	0.82 (21)	0.51 (13)	0.27 (6.9)	0.14 (3.6)	0.13 (3.3)	3.8 (96.4)
Average snowfall inches (cm)	4.7 (12)	2.6 (6.6)	2.5 (6.4)	2.3 (5.8)	3.0 (7.6)	1.6 (4.1)	0.5 (1.3)	1.5 (3.8)	5.6 (14)	9.3 (24)	5.0 (13)	3.2 (8.1)	41.8 (106.7)
Source 1: https://wrcc.dri.edu/cgi-bin/cliMAIN.pl?ak0558
Source 2: https://www.timeanddate.com/weather/usa/kaktovik/climate

== Demographics ==
Historical population
Census	Pop.	Note	%±
1950	46		—
1960	120		160.9%
1970	123		2.5%
1980	165		34.1%
1990	224		35.8%
2000	293		30.8%
2010	239		−18.4%
2020	283		18.4%
U.S. Decennial Census

Kaktovik first appeared on the 1950 U.S. Census as an unincorporated village. In 1960 it returned as Barter Island. In 1970, the name of Kaktovik was restored and it was formally incorporated in 1971.

=== 2020 census ===
As of the 2020 census, Kaktovik had a population of 283. The median age was 30.5 years. 32.5% of residents were under the age of 18 and 8.1% of residents were 65 years of age or older. For every 100 females there were 103.6 males, and for every 100 females age 18 and over there were 103.2 males age 18 and over.

0.0% of residents lived in urban areas, while 100.0% lived in rural areas.

There were 88 households in Kaktovik, of which 51.1% had children under the age of 18 living in them. Of all households, 33.0% were married-couple households, 27.3% were households with a male householder and no spouse or partner present, and 26.1% were households with a female householder and no spouse or partner present. About 27.3% of all households were made up of individuals and 9.1% had someone living alone who was 65 years of age or older.

There were 91 housing units, of which 3.3% were vacant. The homeowner vacancy rate was 0.0% and the rental vacancy rate was 0.0%.

Racial composition as of the 2020 census
Race	Number	Percent
White	12	4.2%
Black or African American	0	0.0%
American Indian and Alaska Native	269	95.1%
Asian	0	0.0%
Native Hawaiian and Other Pacific Islander	0	0.0%
Some other race	0	0.0%
Two or more races	2	0.7%
Hispanic or Latino (of any race)	0	0.0%

=== 2010 census ===
As of the 2010 United States census, there were 239 people living in the city. The racial makeup of the city was 88.7% Native American, 10.0% White and 1.3% from two or more races.

=== 2000 census ===
As of the census of 2000, there were 293 people, 89 households, and 70 families living in the city. The population density was 371.0 inhabitants per square mile (143.2/km^{2}). There were 95 housing units at an average density of 120.3 units per square mile (46.4 units/km^{2}). The racial makeup of the city was 14.68% White, 75.43% Native American, 0.34% Asian, 0.68% from other races, and 8.87% from two or more races.

There were 89 households, out of which 47.2% had children under the age of 18 living with them, 48.3% were married couples living together, 14.6% had a female householder with no husband present, and 21.3% were non-families. 21.3% of all households were made up of individuals, and 3.4% had someone living alone who was 65 years of age or older. The average household size was 3.29 and the average family size was 3.76.

In the city the population was spread out, with 35.8% under the age of 18, 6.8% from 18 to 24, 27.0% from 25 to 44, 22.9% from 45 to 64, and 7.5% who were 65 years of age or older. The median age was 32 years. For every 100 females, there were 110.8 males. For every 100 females age 18 and over, there were 116.1 males.

The median income for a household in the city was $55,624, and the median income for a family was $60,417. Males had a median income of $50,000 versus $38,750 for females. The per capita income for the city was $22,031. About 9.9% of families and 6.6% of the population were below the poverty line, including 5.3% of those under the age of eighteen and none of those 65 or over.

== Politics ==
As of 2019, residents have benefited from oil development, and some think that drilling and caribou can co-exist.

In the 2024 United States presidential election, 57 Kaktovik residents voted for Trump, and 12 voted for Harris.

== Education ==
The North Slope Borough School District operates the Harold Kaveolook School in Kaktovik. The school suffered a major loss due to fire on the night of February 6, 2020.
