= Mathematical folklore =

Communally-attributed mathematical results

In common mathematical parlance, a mathematical result is called folklore if it is an unpublished result with no clear originator, but which is well-circulated and believed to be true among the specialists. More specifically, folk mathematics, or mathematical folklore, is the body of theorems, definitions, proofs, facts or techniques that circulate among mathematicians by word of mouth, but have not yet appeared in print, either in books or in scholarly journals.

Quite important at times for researchers are folk theorems, which are results known, at least to experts in a field, and are considered to have established status, though not published in complete form. Sometimes, these are only alluded to in the public literature. An example is a book of exercises, described on the back cover:

This book contains almost 350 exercises in the basics of ring theory. The problems form the "folklore" of ring theory, and the solutions are given in as much detail as possible.

Another distinct category is well-knowable mathematics, a term introduced by John Conway. These mathematical matters are known and factual, but not in active circulation in relation with current research (i.e., untrendy). Both of these concepts are attempts to describe the actual context in which research work is done.

Some people, in particular non-mathematicians, use the term folk mathematics to refer to the informal mathematics studied in many ethno-cultural studies of mathematics. Although the term "mathematical folklore" can also be used within the mathematics circle to describe the various aspects of their esoteric culture and practices (e.g., slang, proverb, limerick, joke).

== Stories, sayings and jokes ==
Mathematical folklore can also refer to the unusual (and possibly apocryphal) stories or jokes involving mathematicians or mathematics that are told verbally in mathematics departments. Compilations include tales collected in G. H. Hardy's A Mathematician's Apology and (Krantz 2002); examples include:

- Srinivasa Ramanujan's taxicab numbers.
- Galileo dropping weights from the Leaning Tower of Pisa.
- An apple falling on Isaac Newton's head to inspire his theory of gravitation.
- John von Neumann's encounter with the famous fly puzzle.
- The drinking, duel, and early death of Galois.
- Richard Feynman cracking safes in the Manhattan Project.
- Alfréd Rényi's definition of a mathematician: "a device for turning coffee into theorems".
- Pál Turán's suggestion that weak coffee was only suitable for lemmata.
- The "turtles all the way down" story told by Stephen Hawking.
- Fermat's lost simple proof.
- The unwieldy proof and associated controversies of the Four Color Theorem.
- The murder of Hippasus by the Pythagoreans for his discovery of irrational numbers, specifically, √2.
- Sir William Rowan Hamilton, in a sudden moment of inspiration, discovered quaternions while crossing Brougham Bridge.

== See also ==
- List of mathematical jargon

== Bibliography ==
- Krantz, Steven G. (2002), Mathematical Apocrypha: Stories & Anecdotes of Mathematicians & the Mathematical
- David Harel, "On Folk Theorems", Communications of the ACM 23:7:379-389 (July 1980)
