= An Introduction to the Philosophy of Mathematics =

2012 book by Mark Colyvan

- Author: Mark Colyvan
- Cover artist: Tibor Majlath
- Language: English
- Series: Cambridge Introductions to Philosophy
- Subject: Philosophy of mathematics
- Publisher: Cambridge University Press
- Publication date: 2012
- Pages: 188
- ISBN: 978-0-521-53341-6
- OCLC: 1031490497
- Dewey Decimal: 510.1
- LC Class: QA8.4.C654
- Website: Cambridge University Press

An Introduction to the Philosophy of Mathematics is a 2012 textbook on the philosophy of mathematics by Mark Colyvan. It has a focus on issues in contemporary philosophy, such as the mathematical realism–anti-realism debate and the philosophical significance of mathematical practice, and largely skips over historical debates. It covers a range of topics in contemporary philosophy of mathematics including various forms of mathematical realism, the Quine–Putnam indispensability argument, mathematical fictionalism, mathematical explanation, the "unreasonable effectiveness of mathematics", paraconsistent mathematics, and the role of mathematical notation in the progress of mathematics. The book was praised as accessible and well-written and the reaction to its contemporary focus was largely positive, although some academic reviewers felt that it should have covered the historical debates over logicism, formalism and intuitionism in more detail. Other aspects of the book that received praise were its coverage of mathematical explanation, its appeal to mathematicians and other non-philosophers, and its discussion questions and further readings, whilst its epilogue and short length received a more mixed reception.

== Overview ==
An Introduction to the Philosophy of Mathematics is a textbook on the philosophy of mathematics focusing on the issue of mathematical realism, i.e. the question of whether or not there are mathematical objects, and mathematical explanation. Colyvan described his intention for the book as being a textbook that "[gets] beyond the first half of the twentieth century and [explores] the issues capturing the attention of contemporary philosophers of mathematics". As a result, the book focuses less on historical debates in the philosophy of mathematics than other similar textbooks and more on contemporary issues, including the philosophy of mathematical practice.

== Summary ==
The book has eight chapters and an epilogue with each chapter ending with a list of discussion questions and further readings. Chapter 1 briefly covers what Colyvan calls the "big isms" which dominated early 20th century philosophy of mathematics: logicism, formalism and intuitionism. It then turns to the philosophical issues raised by Paul Benacerraf in his papers "What is Mathematical Truth?" (1965) and "What Numbers Could Not Be" (1971).

Chapter 2 concerns the limits of mathematics and relevant constraining mathematical theorems. It discusses the Löwenheim–Skolem theorem and its connection with Cantor's theorem, including a proof of Cantor's theorem and an explanation of why the two theorems are not contradictory. It also discusses Gödel's incompleteness theorems and Gödel and Cohen's work on the independence of the continuum hypothesis. These results are used to motivate the debate between mathematical realism and anti-realism.

Following Hilary Putnam, Colyvan distinguishes between realism about mathematical truths and realism about mathematical objects in chapter 3. He argues that "‘it seems a very quick path from objective truth to objects" and so focuses subsequent discussion on realism about mathematical objects. The chapter goes on to distinguish between various types of realism, including full-blooded platonism, structuralism and the physicalist realism of writers such as Penelope Maddy, and to cover naturalism and the Quine–Putnam indispensability argument. Objections to the indispensability argument from Maddy, Hartry Field and Elliott Sober are also presented.

Chapter 4 focuses on mathematical anti-realism (aka nominalism), specifically mathematical fictionalism. It gives an introduction to the fictionalism of Hartry Field and his nominalisation program, which Colyvan calls the hard road to nominalism. Colyvan also covers so-called easy roads to nominalism; such views are "easy" because they do not attempt to remove mathematical entities from our best scientific theories as Field's nominalisation project attempts to. These include the fictionalism of Jody Azzouni and the metaphorical account of mathematical language propounded by Stephen Yablo. In the chapter, Colyvan objects to Yablo's views, claiming that mathematics appears in scientific explanations and that where metaphorical language is used in explanations, it is being used as a shorthand for a non-metaphorical explanation or else it must be interpreted literally.

Following on from this discussion, chapter 5 concerns mathematical explanation and the "explanatory turn" in the realism–anti-realism debate in which the indispensability argument was reframed in terms of the explanatory power of mathematics. It begins with a consideration of different theories of explanation, resulting in Colyvan advocating for a unification account. This is the view that explanations work by bringing multiple different phenomena under the same theoretical framework. He then distinguishes between intra-mathematical explanations, mathematical explanations of mathematical facts, and extra-mathematical explanations, mathematical explanations of non-mathematical, empirical facts. He uses the unification account of explanation to attempt to explain the difference between mathematical proofs that are explanatory and those that are not, citing proofs of Euclid's theorem, Rolle's theorem and the formula for the sum of the first n natural numbers as examples of non-explanatory proofs. He then moves on to extra-mathematical explanations, arguing that mathematics is more than just a descriptive tool and provides genuine explanations of empirical facts. He presents the examples of the mathematical explanations of the life cycles of periodical cicadas, why hive-bee honeycomb has a hexagonal structure, the distribution of asteroids across the Solar System, and Lorentz contraction to support his argument.

Chapter 6 is about the applicability of mathematics and its "unreasonable effectiveness" when applied within science. To illustrate the unreasonable effectiveness of mathematics, Colyvan writes about how James Clerk Maxwell formulated the Maxwell–Ampère law as an analogue of Newtonian gravitational theory, but that it produced completely novel predictions that ended up being confirmed. He attempts to explain this unreasonable effectiveness by providing a mapping account of mathematical application. According to this account, mathematical models act as maps of physical systems by abstracting away from particular details to more structural features of the system. In this way, the abstract structures of mathematics can be used to represent physical systems via similarity relations. Colyvan presents the case study of mathematical models in population ecology to illustrate this mapping account.

Chapter 7 explores issues surrounding paraconsistent mathematics and logic. Colyvan argues that mathematical theory can be inconsistent whilst still being useful, pointing to naive set theory and early infinitesimal calculus as examples of mathematical theories that were later proved to be inconsistent but were fruitfully worked on by mathematicians. He also proposes that the logic used by mathematicians must be some kind of contradiction-tolerant or paraconsistent logic rather than classical logic to account for this fact. He provides the Logic of Paradox (LP) as an example of such a paraconsistent logic which does not lead to the principle of explosion by using modified truth tables and a third truth value i which he suggests should be referred to as "true and false".

Chapter 8 is on the philosophical significance of mathematical notation. Colyvan argues that mathematical progress can sometimes be attributed to changes in notation. The chapter includes a number of examples to support this idea. For example, Colyvan says that the shift from Roman numerals to Arabic numerals could have prompted mathematical progress because Arabic numerals, unlike Roman numerals, have recursion built in. Another example provided is the relevance of mathematical notation in the proof of the impossibility of squaring the circle which is used to illustrate the idea that the same procedure being represented in different ways can reveal non-obvious connections within mathematics. The chapter also considers the importance of definition in mathematics using the example of the evolving definition of the term polyhedron.

The epilogue is titled "Desert Island Theorems" and contains a list of 20 important theorems and 5 open problems which Colyvan believes all philosophers of mathematics should know. There is also a two-page list of "interesting numbers". Short discussions on the philosophical importance and impact of each of these theorems, problems and numbers is also included after each item.

== Reception ==
The contemporary focus of the book was met with praise. Noah Friedman-Biglin, reviewing the book in Metascience, felt this feature of the book was "distinctive" and praised the coverage of mathematical explanation which he called "a topic which is attracting the interest of many professional philosophers of mathematics now". Richard Pettigrew, reviewing the book in The Bulletin of Symbolic Logic, felt that the book "really begins" at chapter 5 where it moves from a "fairly standard, if admirably clear, presentation of well-worn material" to "an exciting exploration of nascent topics on which there is still relatively little literature." He said that the book's use of examples whilst exploring these topics instead of fully formed arguments was a feature of the book that "will provoke [students] to formulate their own philosophical hypotheses and arguments more readily than more traditional textbooks." He concluded that "while some of the book might lack a little of the detail and rigour I'd like future students of the topic to value, Colyvan has written the first textbook that initiates the student into the current period in the philosophy of mathematics." In a review in Teaching Philosophy, Carl Wagner said that "Colyvan has a real talent for conveying the excitement of these ongoing debates, and encouraging readers to develop their own views on these issues". He described chapter 5 as "[standing] out even from the other uniformly excellent chapters of this book" and gave specific praise to its coverage of extra-mathematical explanations for being "particularly interesting". Jean-Pierre Marquis characterised the book in Mathematical Reviews as "a warm breeze after a cold winter in the rarefied atmosphere of the philosophy of mathematics." He argued that "[f]or too long now, the field has been frozen in the age of formalism, logicism and intuitionism" and that with regards to its goal of presenting more contemporary material, the book was "a splendid success". The contemporary focus of the book, as well as its use of actual mathematics, were also identified as interesting aspects of the book by Mark Hunacek, who reviewed the book for the Mathematical Association of America.

The book was also widely characterised as accessible and well-written. David Irvine said in a review in Philosophia Mathematica that the book was among the best textbooks on the philosophy of mathematics released since 2000, alongside Alexander George and Daniel Velleman's Philosophies of Mathematics, Stewart Shapiro's Thinking about Mathematics and Michael Potter's Set Theory and Its Philosophy. He said that the book's "knack for jumping right to the heart of the issue" meant that it was "[n]ever overwhelming" and concluded that it was "a pleasure to teach from and [that he could] report that students having their first exposure to topics in the philosophy of mathematics have found it to be both accessible and stimulating." Zach Weber said of the book in the Australasian Journal of Philosophy that "Colyvan has condensed his own body of research into a highly accessible textbook." In a review in Philosophy in Review, Sam Baron called the book "beautifully written" and said that it "[exemplifies] the key features that a textbook in philosophy ought to have: it is clear, lively and enjoyable to read." Hunacek described the book as "lively and entertaining" as well as "a chatty, interesting book with an agenda that sets it somewhat apart from many other books on the [philosophy of mathematics]". Cristian Soto reviewed the book in Critica: Revista Hispanoamericana de Filosofía, calling the book "an accurate and accessible preamble to some of the most interesting riddles in the [philosophy of mathematics]". Noah Friedman-Biglin, in Metascience, praised the book's writing style as "accessible" and characterised the book as "a fine contribution to a crowded area: it provides a lucidly written, non-technical introduction to some topics in the current literature on philosophy of mathematics." Marquis said that the book was "very well written and a pleasure to read" and that the chapters were "short, clear and well structured".

The book's audience and suitability as a university course text were covered in multiple reviews. Baron felt that the accessible treatment of mathematical results in the book paired with the way it "seamlessly weaves together introductory material on the debate over mathematical realism with state of the art research" made it appropriate for undergraduate or postgraduate courses. He also said that the book "covers a surprisingly wide range of topics" which he felt increased its utility in creating courses with different focuses. Friedman-Biglin felt that "students will find this book an excellent place to begin studying philosophy of mathematics, and it could easily serve as the basis for an interesting course for undergraduates." Weber felt that the book's "conversational style and brisk pacing" made it "clearly designed for a lively undergraduate course". However, he thought the book was short, being suited more to a half-semester or summer course, or as a starting point for discussions. Hunacek said that his main concern with the book was its short length which led him to wonder whether it could support a full-semester course. Nonetheless, he felt that it "has considerable value apart from its use as a [course] text" and said that "a mathematician might enjoy reading this (as I did) as a way of learning, in a painless and entertaining way, about interesting ideas". Overall, he said that he enjoyed and recommended the book. Wagner said "This book, while perhaps written primarily for philosophy students, could also be very profitably read by students and teachers of mathematics. Indeed, this reviewer hopes to use it both in a capstone course for undergraduate mathematics majors, and in a graduate seminar for secondary school mathematics teachers." Soto similarly recommended the book for mathematicians and scientists as well as philosophers, saying that it provided an "insightful guide to debates that encompass their areas".

Some reviewers discussed the coverage of certain topics in the book. Irvine felt that "If there is a weakness with the book, it is that the traditional debates over logicism, formalism, and intuitionism are covered in less than half a dozen pages, leaving readers wondering what all the fuss was about." He said that if a second edition was ever released, it should expand on these topics. He also said that he would have preferred if the book included more proofs such as a proof of Russell's paradox. Baron similarly stated that some might find the brief coverage of the "big isms" unsatisfying but argued that it was appropriate given the books focus on the issue of realism which Baron calls "largely orthogonal to the big isms charted in Chapter One." In contrast to these comments, Wagner called Colyvan's coverage of the "big isms" in chapter 1 "a masterly piece of compressed exposition". Pettigrew commented on the lack of coverage of category theory, reverse mathematics, and automated reasoning and computer-aided proofs but went on to say "no textbook can cover all topics, and one might feel that these belong more naturally to a more advanced course in the subject." Friedman-Biglin also felt that topics such as work on the nature of mathematical truth and the foundations of mathematics were missing from the book. He argued that Colyvan excluded these topics due to a desire to keep the book less technical but felt that he "goes too far in trying to mitigate its effect". However, he felt that concerns about the lack of mathematical details in some areas do not "carry much weight" as "the main line of argument in Colyvan's book might have been obscured by including too many formalisms". Marquis said on the topic that "One could quibble about this topic or that one, this reference or that one, but I think that these criticisms would miss the point. As an introduction to the field, the choice of topics proposed is entirely justified."

Pettigrew said of the epilogue that he would have preferred if it covered fewer theorems and more proofs and applications. Nonetheless, he said that "it is certainly a valuable resource for a student entering the philosophy of mathematics without a strong mathematical background." Hunacek said that he was "puzzled" by the inclusion of the epilogue which he said contained items which "seemed to have no particular philosophical significance". Wagner praised the epilogue, calling it "excellent" whilst suggesting some changes to its presentation of the theorems covered. Weber praised the further readings as "excellent guides for further study". Marquis also praised the inclusion of discussion questions and further readings, calling it "a wonderful initiative".
