= The Indispensability of Mathematics =

2001 book by Mark Colyvan

- Author: Mark Colyvan
- Subject: Philosophy of mathematics
- Published: 2001
- Publisher: Oxford University Press
- Pages: 192 pp.
- ISBN: 9780195137545

The Indispensability of Mathematics is a 2001 book by Mark Colyvan in which he examines the Quine–Putnam indispensability argument in the philosophy of mathematics. This thesis is based on the premise that mathematical entities are placed on the same ontological foundation as other theoretical entities indispensable to our best scientific theories.
