= Mathematical Platonism =

Form of realism that suggests that mathematical entities are abstract

Mathematical Platonism is the form of realism that suggests that mathematical entities, such as numbers, are abstract, have no spatiotemporal or causal properties, and are eternal and unchanging.

== Overview ==
The term Platonism is used because such a view is seen to parallel Plato's Theory of Forms and "world of Ideas" (from Greek εἶδος, eîdos), most famously described in his Allegory of the Cave: the everyday world, as perceived by the senses, only imperfectly approximates another—unchanging and ultimate—reality, which is accessible to the intellect alone. Both Plato's cave and Platonism have meaningful, not just superficial connections, because Plato's ideas were preceded and probably influenced by the hugely popular Pythagoreans of ancient Greece, who believed that the world was, quite literally, generated by numbers.

A major question considered in mathematical Platonism is: precisely where and how do mathematical entities exist, and how do we come to know of them? If they exist independently of the mind—i.e., are not simply a human invention—is there some sense in which they can be said to occupy a separate, non-physical realm? If so, how is it that we are able to gain access to that world and discover truths about the entities therein?

One proposed answer is the Ultimate Ensemble, a theory that postulates that all structures that exist mathematically also exist physically, in their own universes.

== Views ==
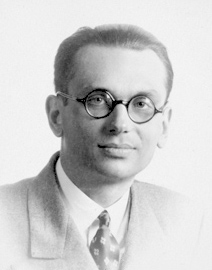
Kurt Gödel

Kurt Gödel's Platonism postulates a special kind of mathematical intuition that lets us perceive mathematical objects directly. (This view bears resemblances to many things Edmund Husserl said about mathematics, and supports Immanuel Kant's idea that mathematics is synthetic a priori.) Philip J. Davis and Reuben Hersh have suggested in their 1999 book The Mathematical Experience that most mathematicians act as though they are Platonists, even though, if pressed to defend the position carefully, they may retreat to formalism.

=== Full-blooded Platonism ===
Full-blooded Platonism (closely related to, and sometimes used synonymously with, plenitudinous Platonism) is a modern variation of Platonism, developed in reaction to the fact that different sets of mathematical entities can be proven to exist depending on the axioms and inference rules employed (for instance, the law of the excluded middle and the axiom of choice). It holds that all mathematical entities exist, so long as some self-consistent framework admits them; i.e., they need not all together be derivable from any single consistent set of axioms, since no such set is metaphysically privileged over alternatives. This has the benefit of providing a ready answer to Benacerraf's dilemma—if any consistent mathematical theory is guaranteed to pick out entities that actually exist, obtaining knowledge thereof poses no problem—though the view has faced criticism for thereby introducing an entirely new difficulty (a "uniqueness problem", wherein mathematical terms appear to lack determinate denotation; see "Platonized naturalism", below).

=== Set-theoretic realism ===
Set-theoretic realism (also set-theoretic Platonism), a position defended by Penelope Maddy, is the view that set theory is about a single universe of sets. This position (which is also known as naturalized Platonism because it is a naturalized version of mathematical Platonism) has been criticized by Mark Balaguer on the basis of Paul Benacerraf's epistemological problem.

=== Platonized naturalism ===
A similar view, termed Platonized naturalism, was later defended by the Stanford–Edmonton School: according to this view, a more traditional kind of Platonism is consistent with naturalism; the more traditional kind of Platonism they defend is distinguished by general principles that assert the existence of abstract objects. This formulation of mathematical Platonism is—as argued by proponents such as Edward Zalta—both proof against Benacerraf's dilemma in much the same way as is full-blooded Platonism, while yet escaping the "uniqueness problem" to which the latter has been alleged to be vulnerable.

== See also ==
- Mathematical object § Platonism
- Modern Platonism
- Philosophy of mathematics
- Quine–Putnam indispensability argument
- Explanatory indispensability argument
