= Alon Harel =

Israeli academic (born 1957)

- אלון הראל
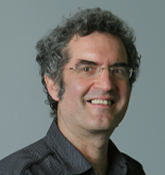
- Born: 1957 (age 68–69)
- Education: Balliol College, Oxford Hebrew University of Jerusalem
- Scientific career
- Fields: Legal studies Legal philosophy Political philosophy
- Workplaces: Hebrew University of Jerusalem
- Doctoral advisor: Joseph Raz

Alon Harel (Hebrew: אלון הראל; born 1957) is a law professor at the Hebrew University of Jerusalem, where he holds the Phillip P. Mizock & Estelle Mizock Chair in Administrative and Criminal Law. He was educated at the Hebrew University of Jerusalem and Balliol College, Oxford (where he earned a D.Phil. in legal philosophy with a dissertation supervised by Joseph Raz). He has been a visiting professor at Columbia University, Harvard University, the University of Toronto, the University of Texas at Austin, and the University of Chicago.

Harel writes on political philosophy, jurisprudence, criminal law, constitutional law, and law and economics. His articles often undertake philosophical and legal issues of contemporary political relevance. In a recent article (co-authored with Yuval Eylon), Harel defends judicial review on the grounds of a "right to a hearing", which, as a participatory right, does not conflict with the right to equal democratic participation.

A leading advocate of Israeli human rights in Israel, Harel has served on the board of directors of the Association for Civil Rights in Israel, and submitted a Brief on Behalf of Conscientious Objectors to the Israeli Supreme Court. He often publishes op-ed pieces in Israeli newspapers. A member of Academia for Equality, an organization working to promote democratization, equality and access to higher education for all communities living in Israel.

Harel is the founder and editor of the journal Jerusalem Review of Legal Studies, together with David Enoch.

In 2015, Harel drew criticism for degrading a right-wing student on his Facebook page, tagging her in a post and suggesting that she "return to first grade civics lessons."

In 2024, Harel wrote a Facebook post in which he claimed that settler and former deputy director of the right-wing legal aid group Honenu, Uri Kirshenbaum, was "participating in a competition as to who will adopt Nazi ideology sooner." after Kirshenbaum had written an article in which he claimed that the IDF's policy of killing many civilians in Gaza should be used in the West Bank. (Note: "Almost indiscriminately in Gaza for a certain period, the IDF bombed buildings and towers, with the complete understanding that masses of children and mothers would be killed," Kirshenbaum wrote. "The required strategy for defense has led Israel to very severely mow down 'innocents' in Gaza because there is no other way to defeat and eradicate Hamas. It's intentional, it's strategic, it's true. Let no one pretend otherwise. Now let someone explain to me why what is true in Gaza is not true in Jenin and Tulkarm, Hebron and Nablus.") On 2 March 2026, the Jerusalem small claims court ordered Harel to pay Kirshenbaum 20,000 shekels for libel.

== Books ==
- Harel, Alon (2014). Why Law Matters. Oxford Legal Philosophy.
- Harel, Alon (February 2018). Wozu Recht: Rechte, Staat und Verfassung im Kontext moderner Gesellschaften. Translated by Veit Friemert (from English). Verlag Karl Alber. ISBN 978-3495489383.
- Harel, Alon (2018). Por qué el derecho importa. Translated by Mariano Vitetta. Marcial Pons.

== Selected publications ==
- ——— (1994), "Efficiency and Fairness in Criminal Law: The Case for a Criminal Law Principle of Comparative Fault", California Law Review, 82 (5): 1181–1229, doi:10.2307/3480909, JSTOR 3480909.
- ———; Parchomovsky, Gideon (1999), "On Hate and Equality", Yale Law Journal, 109 (3): 507–539, doi:10.2307/797410, JSTOR 797410.
- ———; Segal, Uzi (1999), "Criminal law and behavioral law and economics: observations on the neglected role of uncertainty in deterring crime", American Law and Economics Review, 1 (1): 276–312, doi:10.1093/aler/1.1.276.
- ———; Bar-Gill, Oren (2001), "Crime Rates and Expected Sanctions: The Economics of Deterrence Revisited", Journal of Legal Studies, 30 (2): 485–502, doi:10.1086/322055.
- ———; Eylon, Yuval (2006), "The Right to Judicial Review", Virginia Law Review, 92 (5): 991–1022, archived from the original on 16 July 2011.
