= Science Without Numbers =

Book on the philosophy of mathematics

- The cover for the first edition, published by Princeton University Press
- Author: Hartry Field
- Language: English
- Subjects: Philosophy of mathematics
- Publisher: Princeton University Press (1st ed.), Oxford University Press (2nd ed.)
- Publication date: 1980
- Publication place: United States
- Pages: 130
- Award: Lakatos Prize
- ISBN: 978-0-631-12672-0
- OCLC: 967261539
- Dewey Decimal: 501
- LC Class: Q175.F477
- Website: Oxford Academic

Science Without Numbers: A Defence of Nominalism is a 1980 book on the philosophy of mathematics by Hartry Field. In the book, Field defends nominalism, the view that mathematical objects such as numbers do not exist. The book was written broadly in response to an argument for the existence of mathematical objects called the indispensability argument. According to this argument, belief in mathematical objects is justified because mathematics is indispensable to science. The main project of the book is producing technical reconstructions of science that remove reference to mathematical entities, hence showing that mathematics is not indispensable to science.

Modelled on Hilbert's axiomatization of geometry, which eschews numerical distances in favor of primitive geometrical relationships, Field demonstrates an approach to reformulate Newton's theory of gravity without the need to reference numbers. According to Field's philosophical program, mathematics is used in science because it is useful, not because it is true. He supports this view with the idea that mathematics is conservative; that is, mathematics cannot be used to derive any physical facts beyond those already implied by the physical aspects of a theory. He further proves that statements in his nominalist reformulation can be systematically associated with mathematical statements, which he believes explains how mathematics can be used to legitimately derive physical facts from scientific theories.

Science Without Numbers was immediately influential upon release and generated much discussion in the philosophy of mathematics. Areas of debate included to what extent Field's reformulation of Newtonian gravitational theory was an attractive alternative to the original, mathematical theory, and whether its reliance on geometrical objects like spacetime points was acceptable. Technical issues were also raised concerning the definition of conservativeness and Field's use of metalogic and second-order logic. Following the release of the book, other philosophers worked to extend Field's account to areas such as quantum mechanics and general relativity.

== Background ==
Science Without Numbers emerged during a period of renewed interest in the philosophy of mathematics following a number of influential papers by Paul Benacerraf, particularly his 1973 article "Mathematical Truth". In that paper, Benacerraf argued that it is unclear how the existence of non-physical mathematical objects such as numbers and sets can be reconciled with a scientifically acceptable epistemology. This argument was among Field's motivations for writing Science Without Numbers; he aimed to provide an account of mathematics that was compatible with a naturalistic view of the world.

The main goal of the book was to defend nominalism, the view that mathematical objects do not exist, and to undermine the motivations for platonism, the view that mathematical objects do exist. Field believed that the only good argument for platonism is the Quine–Putnam indispensability argument, which argues for belief in mathematical objects because mathematics is indispensable to science. A key motivation for the book was to undermine this argument by showing that mathematics is indeed dispensable to science. (Note: For a more explicit definition of platonism and nominalism, see for example Colyvan 2012, pp. 8–9.)

Independently of the appeal of nominalism, Field was motivated by a desire to formulate scientific explanations "in terms of the intrinsic features of [the] system, without invoking extrinsic entities". For Field, numbers are extrinsic to physics since they are causally irrelevant to the behaviour of physical systems. He argued that things intrinsic to physical theories, like physical objects and spacetime, should be preferred when constructing explanations in science.

According to Field, he began work on the book in the winter of 1978/79, intending to write a long journal article. However, during the process of writing, it became too long to be feasibly published in a journal format. It was initially published in 1980 by Princeton University Press; a second edition was published in 2016 by Oxford University Press featuring minimal changes to the main text and a new preface.

== Summary ==
Science Without Numbers starts with some preliminary remarks in which Field clarifies his aims for the book. He outlines that he is concerned mainly with defending nominalism from the strongest arguments for platonism—the indispensability argument in particular—and is less focused on putting forward a positive argument for his own view. He distinguishes the form of nominalism he aims to defend, fictionalism, from other types of nominalism that were more popular in the philosophy of mathematics at the time. The forms of nominalism popular at the time were revisionist in that they aimed to reinterpret mathematical sentences so that they were not about mathematical objects. In contrast, Field's fictionalism accepts that mathematics is committed to the existence of mathematical objects, but argues that mathematics is simply untrue.

Field adopts an instrumentalist account of mathematics, arguing that mathematics does not have to be true to be useful. Field argues that, unlike theoretical entities like electrons and quarks, mathematical objects do not allow theories to predict anything new. Instead, mathematics' role in science is simply to aid in the derivation of empirical conclusions from other empirical claims, which could theoretically occur without using mathematics at all. Field develops this instrumentalist idea in more technical detail using the idea that mathematics is conservative. This means that if a nominalistic statement is derivable from a scientific theory with the use of mathematics, then it is also derivable without the mathematics. Therefore, the predictive success of the theory can be fully explained by the truth of the nominalist portions of science, excluding any mathematics.

Field takes the conservativeness of mathematics to explain why it is acceptable for mathematics to be used in science. He further argues that its usefulness is due to it simplifying the derivation of empirical conclusions. For example, although basic arithmetic can be reproduced non-numerically in first-order logic, the derivations this produces are far more longwinded. (Note: For the specific example of arithmetic, see Science Without Numbers, Ch. 2. "First Illustration of Why Mathematical Entities are Useful: Arithmetic".) Field shows how mathematics can skip these derivations through the use of bridge laws, which can connect nominalistic statements to mathematical ones, allowing derivations to proceed efficiently within mathematics before returning to the nominalistic theory.

Field's reformulation of physics is based on Hilbert's axiomatization of geometry, in which numerical distances are replaced with relations between spacetime points like betweenness and congruence. Hilbert proved a representation theorem showing that these relations between spacetime points are homomorphic to numerical distance relations. This notion of a representation theorem serves as the bridge law in Field's approach, allowing mathematical reasoning to be associated with nominalistic counterparts in a strictly structure-preserving way.

In addition to Hilbert's treatment of geometry, Field's reformulation takes similar ideas from measurement theory to nominalize scalar physical quantities like temperature and gravitational potential. Field again uses relational concepts (like temperature-betweenness and temperature-congruence) to recover various features of scalar fields in physics. Extending ideas from the previous sections of the book, Field produces nominalist versions of the concepts of continuity, products, derivatives, gradients, Laplacians and vector calculus. Using these nominalist reconstructions, Field shows how to reformulate both the field equation of Newtonian gravity (Poisson's equation) and its equation of motion. Besides the technical contents of the book, Science Without Numbers also includes discussions on the philosophical viability of Field's approach, including the benefits of intrinsic explanations and the challenges of its prolific use of spacetime points and second-order logic.

== Technical details and analysis ==
=== Dispensability and attractiveness ===
Science Without Numbers attempts to show the dispensability of mathematics to science. However, Field did not understand dispensability merely as the ability to eliminate mathematics from science; he further required that the elimination result in an "attractive" theory. Technically, any class of entities is eliminable from a theory so long as it can be separated out from the rest of the theory, according to Craig's theorem. However, Field rejected this approach to eliminating entities as uninformative since it does not result in a theory based on "a small number of basic principles".

In Science Without Numbers, Field argued that his nominalist theory was attractive because it offers intrinsic explanations of physical facts. Field does not precisely define intrinsicality but he does say that extrinsic entities are those "whose properties are irrelevant to the behaviour of the system being explained". He also states that extrinsic explanations tend to be arbitrary because they rely on arbitrary choices about units of measurement like inches or metres. He argues that intrinsic theories can remove arbitrariness and even explain the arbitrariness found in other formulations. For example, a uniqueness theorem for Hilbert's axioms shows that the rules of geometry are invariant under a multiplicative factor on distance; for Field, this explains why different units of measurement are equally valid and it does so in terms of the intrinsic structure of spacetime.

One criticism of Field's approach contends that Field has ignored theoretical virtues beyond intrinsicality such as unification and simplicity. According to this line of thought, mathematical scientific theories are more attractive than nominalist theories precisely because mathematics unifies and simplifies the theory. Field's method for nominalizing science, by contrast, is necessarily a piecemeal approach, in that it must proceed theory by theory and will not necessarily provide an overarching framework like mathematics does.

=== Conservativeness ===
The conservativeness of mathematics claims that for any nominalist theory N and mathematical theory M, everything that is a logical consequence of N + M must also be a logical consequence of just N. (Note: Technically, this statement of the conservativeness of mathematics is only valid if N is mathematically agnostic. In general, scientific theories will make claims that are not mathematically agnostic. For example, the statement "all objects obey Newton's laws" implies that mathematical objects do not exist because mathematical objects do not obey Newton's laws. If this is the case, then the combination of N + M is simply inconsistent; N implies that no mathematical objects exist, whilst M implies that some mathematical objects exist. For a more general statement of the conservativeness of mathematics, nominalistic statements and theories must first be rewritten in a mathematically agnostic form like "all objects that are not mathematical objects obey Newton's laws".) However, the concept of logical consequence is ambiguous. It can be thought of semantically; in which case, it is put in terms of the logical impossibility of the theory being true and the entailed statement being false. Or it can be thought of syntactically; that is, put in terms of the derivability of the entailed statement from the theory. In Science Without Numbers, Field included proofs in first-order logic that mathematics is both syntactically and semantically conservative. However, for his full nominalization of Newtonian gravitational theory, which relies on second-order logic, he only showed that mathematics is semantically conservative.

A prominent area of discussion on Science Without Numbers is the problems that arise from these two ideas of logical consequence. According to Stewart Shapiro, the project within Science Without Numbers is best understood when assuming a syntactic version of conservativeness. Throughout Science Without Numbers, conservativeness is explained in terms of derivability, and the semantic interpretation is potentially problematic for nominalism because it relies on the existence of things like models or possibilities. On the other hand, a version of Gödel's incompleteness theorems holds for Field's nominalization. This means that there are some facts about spacetime that cannot be derived from Field's nominalist theory and, therefore, the syntactic conservativeness result does not hold for Field's full second-order theory.

A related issue concerns Field's use of metalogic. His proof of semantic conservativeness was a model-theoretic proof using set theory and his proof of syntactic conservativeness was proof-theoretic using standard proof theory. These proofs are metalogical because they are about the properties of logical systems and define logical terms like logical consequence. One argument against Field is that his use of metalogic is not acceptable because his proofs include mathematical objects like models and proofs, but he had not provided a nominalization of metalogic.

In Science Without Numbers, Field stated that his use of mathematical objects was valid because his argument was merely a reductio ad absurdum; an argument that assuming mathematics to be true leaves it in "an unstable position: it entails its own unjustifiability". However, some analyses of the work criticized this justification, claiming that conservativeness was used by Field to explain why it is acceptable for mathematics to be used in science, which goes beyond a reductio argument. In papers released after Science Without Numbers in response to these objections, Field attempted to give a nominalist interpretation of metalogic by taking modal operators as primitive and using these to define a semantic version of logical consequence. (Note: Prominent objections to Field's nominalization of metalogic come from Bob Hale and Crispin Wright, focused in particular on a supposed tension between conservativeness and Field's characterization of mathematics as false but possibly true. See, for example, Hale 1990 and Wright & Hale 1992.)

=== Spacetime points and use of second-order logic ===
In Science Without Numbers, Field's nominalization of Newtonian gravity replaced reference to numbers with spacetime points. In doing so, Field assumed that spacetime points are concrete physical objects, a view about spacetime called substantivalism. This is opposed to relationalism, which claims that spacetime does not exist beyond a set of relations between physical objects. Some criticisms of Science Without Numbers focused on Field's acceptance of substantivalism and the idea that spacetime points are just as problematic as numbers. In Science Without Numbers, Field justified his acceptance of substantivalism on the basis that spacetime is causally and spatiotemporally accessible, unlike numbers.

Another area of debate concerns the structural richness of spacetime. In Field's nominalization, spacetime is allowed to have a rich structure with infinitely many points and spacetime regions. In this way, Field builds into spacetime almost the entire structure of the reals, leading to the criticism that Field's nominalization is just as ontologically exuberant as admitting number theory. Furthermore, under Field's nominalization, statements that are undecidable in standard set theory like the continuum hypothesis become statable as assertions about spacetime. In other words, Field's nominalization creates facts about the structure of spacetime that are arguably unknowable or physically indeterminate. Field argues in Science Without Numbers that his nominalization is less rich than the reals since it includes no metric or preferred frame of reference with which to define an objective number line or arithmetical operations. And he argues that any undecidable statements in his theory are "recherché" and unlikely to affect practical physics.

Field's full nominalization in Science Without Numbers quantifies over not just spacetime points but also regions of points. Technically, this requires some form of second-order logic to quantify over sets or sums of points. To avoid an interpretation that would commit his reformulation to the existence of sets, Field suggested that his use of second-order logic could be understood as a logic of mereology, what he called "the complete logic of Goodmanian sums". Nonetheless, Field's nominalization retains some technical downsides from its use of second-order logic, in particular the theory is not recursively enumerable and it renders some existential claims as logical truths.

In Science Without Numbers, Field considered an approach based fully in first-order logic. This approach, instead of taking points as fundamental and construing regions as sums of points, takes regions to be fundamental and views points merely as minimal regions. However, it has been shown that within such a first-order system, Field's representation theorems contradict his conservativeness proof.

=== Extensions ===
Starting with a review of Science Without Numbers by David Malament, many have questioned whether Field's approach can be extended to areas of modern physics like quantum mechanics. Malament argued that Newtonian gravitational theory is especially susceptible to Field's approach because it is a spacetime theory. However, phase space theories like Hamiltonian mechanics and quantum mechanics pose a greater challenge for nominalist reformulation because they are theories about possible physical states of a system, which are likely to be nominalistically unacceptable. Similar arguments from Alasdair Urquhart and Michael Resnik have claimed that Field's approach will not extend to Einstein's general theory of relativity or statistical physics.

Following the publication of Science Without Numbers, other theorists have attempted to extend Field's nominalizations to other areas of physics. For example, Mark Balaguer has argued that quantum mechanics can be reformulated so long as one interprets the probabilities inherent in quantum theory as real physical propensities of systems. Another approach is proposed by Eddy Keming Chen, which aims to nominalize quantum mechanics in terms of local phases and amplitudes of the universal wave function. A nominalist reformulation of general relativity has been attempted by Frank Arntzenius and Cian Dorr, whilst work done by Glen Meyer on statistical physics is less optimistic.

The reformulations of quantum mechanics by Balaguer and Chen are nominalizations of only the part of phase space corresponding to the actual states of physical systems. However, Geoffrey Hellman and Mary Leng note that unless the full phase space is nominalized, the nominalist reformulations will lack the full causal-explanatory reasoning of the mathematical version of the theory. Due to the issues particular to nominalizing phase spaces, by the time of the release of the second edition in 2016, Field expressed some pessimism that his project could be fully carried out for quantum mechanics.

== Reception and legacy ==
Science Without Numbers was described in early reviews as an important and novel contribution to the philosophy of mathematics. Its focus on applied mathematics was welcomed as a significant development and its technical results were seen as impressive achievements that were of considerable philosophical interest in themselves. Nonetheless, reviews noted that Field's work was a first step towards a full nominalization of science and would require further work. This included both extensions to other scientific theories and a greater focus on the philosophical issues involved. Some reviewers found that although the book was technically impressive, it did not provide an adequate philosophical motivation to pursue nominalism in the first place.

Field's argumentation was generally praised as detailed and convincing, and David Malament commended the "spare, clean prose". Some found the style of presentation technical in some places and not accessible to those without expertise in the approaches used, but Bernard Linsky stated it was accessible enough for those with an interest in the philosophy of mathematics. Kenneth Manders found the sudden shift from the first-order logic used in early sections of the book to second-order logic within the full nominalization jarring. Field explained in the second edition that this was because he had not fully "appreciated the pressures toward going beyond first-order logic" when writing the first few chapters.

Science Without Numbers jointly won the 1986 Lakatos Prize, an award given to "outstanding contributions to the philosophy of science" by the London School of Economics, with Bas van Fraassen's The Scientific Image. These two publications have been credited with the emergence of fictionalism as a viable philosophical position in contemporary philosophy, which had previously been an unpopular view. Science Without Numbers dominated discussions about nominalism throughout the 1980s and 1990s. According to John P. Burgess and Gideon Rosen, Field's work has been so influential that "in assigning credit (or blame) for the contemporary prominence of the issue of nominalism, Field must be named immediately after Quine, Goodman, Benacerraf, and Putnam."

With the release of the second edition by Oxford University Press in 2016, Stefan Buijsman called Science Without Numbers "unquestionably a classic work" that had "caused a stir in the philosophical community that in some ways still has not subsided". Buijsman praised the second edition for its new preface that illuminates Field's motivations when originally writing the book and how his views had evolved since its publication, an opinion echoed by Geoffrey Hellman and Mary Leng. Included in the second edition was a letter sent to Field in 1980 by W. V. Quine, the originator of the indispensability argument, who called the book "an impressive piece of work: reasonable, ingenious, learned, and as central philosophically as can be".

A workshop called Science Without Numbers, 40 Years Later—originally scheduled as a symposium session for the American Philosophical Association—was held remotely in November 2020 due to the COVID-19 pandemic. The workshop's website said the book had "become one of the most influential works in the philosophy of mathematics" and that its impact had extended into several other areas of philosophy. Field's technical results, such as his nominalization of Newtonian gravitational theory and corresponding representation theorem, continue to be viewed as important achievements. But, by the 21st century, a consensus had emerged that Field's project had not been successfully carried out, particularly due to issues with extending his approach to modern physical theories. As a response to the indispensability argument, its efficacy remains disputed.
