= Sacher Institute =

Institute at the Hebrew University of Jerusalem

The Harry and Michael Sacher Institute for Legislative Research and Comparative Law
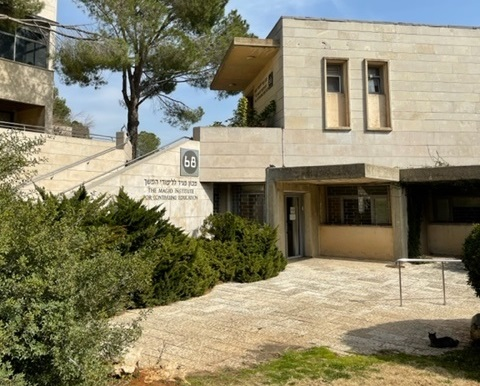
- Entrance at the Sacher Institute, Mount Scopus campus
- Other name: המכון למחקרי חקיקה ולמשפט השוואתי על שם הארי ומיכאל סאקר
- Parent institution: Hebrew University of Jerusalem
- Established: 1959
- Focus: Legislature, comparative law
- Faculty: Faculty of Law
- Location: Mount Scopus campus of the Hebrew University of Jerusalem, Jerusalem, Israel
- Website: Sacher Institute

The Harry and Michael Sacher Institute for Legislative Research and Comparative Law (Hebrew: המכון למחקרי חקיקה ולמשפט השוואתי על שם הארי ומיכאל סאקר; commonly known as the Sacher Institute (Note: Hebrew: מכון סאקר, romanized: Machon Saker)) is an Israeli research institute and publishing house operating within the Faculty of Law at the Hebrew University of Jerusalem. The institute was established in 1959 and specializes in legislation and comparative law.

In its early years, the institute advised on legislative matters for the Ministry of Justice and official bodies by producing research and position papers and assisting in drafting legislative proposals.

The institute serves as the publisher of several academic journals: Mishpatim (Hebrew: משפטים, lit. 'Sentences') and Hukim (Hebrew: חוקים, lit. 'Laws') from the Faculty, and Israeli Criminology from the Israeli Criminological Association. Additionally, it produces the Jerusalem Review of Legal Studies in partnership with Oxford University Press.

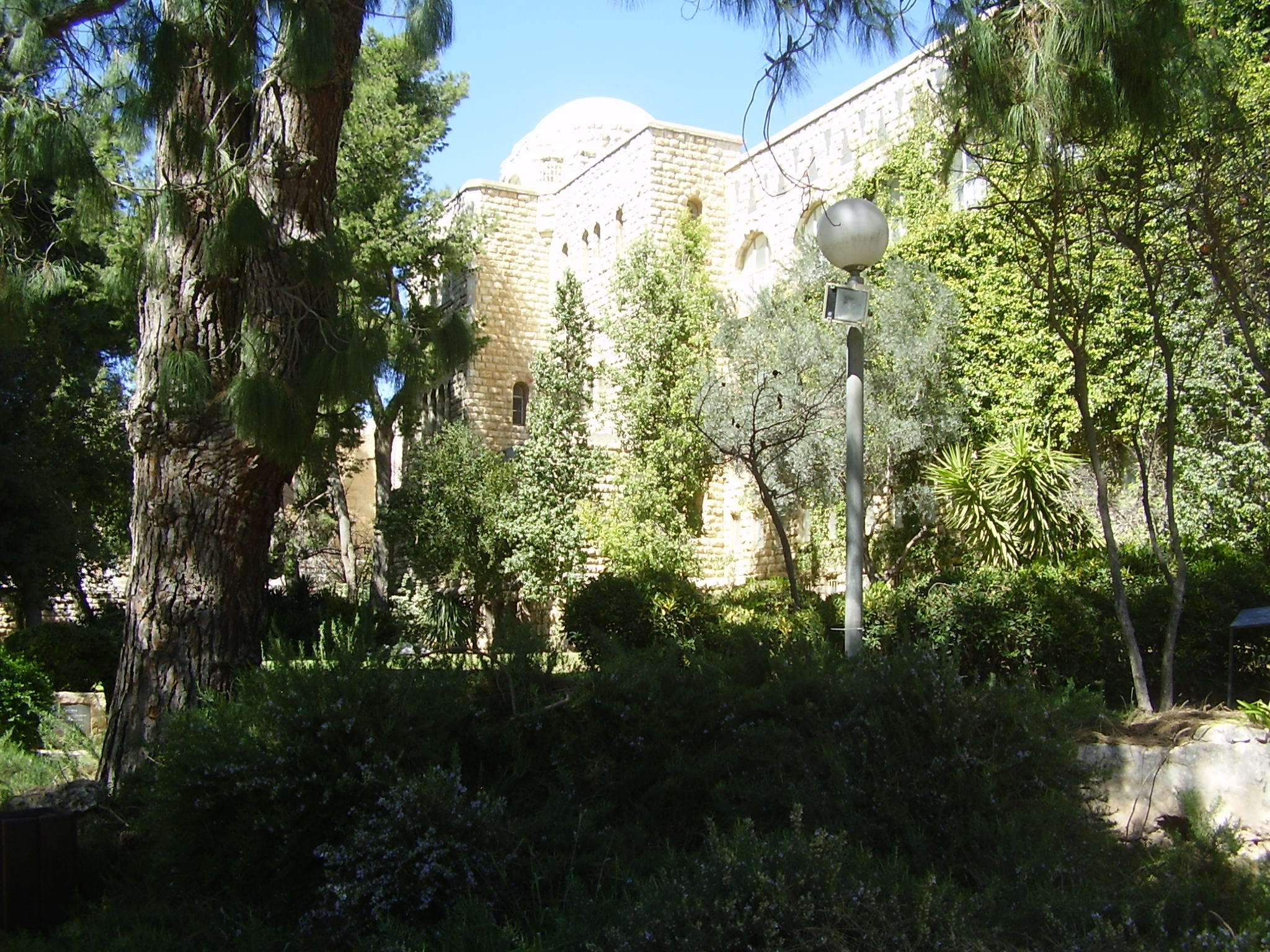
Faculty of Law, Mount Scopus campus of the Hebrew University of Jerusalem
