= The Applicability of Mathematics in Science: Indispensability and Ontology =

- Author: Sorin Bangu
- Language: English
- Series: New Directions in the Philosophy of Science
- Subjects: Philosophy of mathematics; Quine–Putnam indispensability argument
- Publisher: Palgrave Macmillan
- Publication date: 2012
- Pages: 252
- ISBN: 978-0-230-28520-0
- OCLC: 1329160456
- Website: SpringerLink

The Applicability of Mathematics in Science: Indispensability and Ontology is a 2012 book on the philosophy of mathematics by Sorin Bangu. It argues for an improved form of indispensability argument based on a Quinean-inspired naturalism and confirmational holism, as well as a position he calls "posit realism". It also explores the applications of mathematics in scientific discovery and explanation.
