= Gordon Baker (disambiguation) =

Gordon Baker (1938–2002) was an American-English philosopher.

Gordon Baker may also refer to:

- Gordon Baker (golfer) in U.S. Junior Amateur Golf Championship
- Gordon Baker (rugby league) for Halifax RLFC
- Gordon Baker (special effects artist), Academy Award for Best Visual Effects
