= Deliberative indispensability argument =

Philosophical argument about metaethics

The deliberative indispensability argument is an argument for normative realism defended by David Enoch, most prominently in his 2011 book Taking Morality Seriously. The argument states that there are objective normative truths about what people should do or think. Enoch was inspired by other indispensability arguments in the philosophy of mathematics. These arguments justify belief in mathematical objects like numbers because they are indispensable for scientific explanation. Enoch applied a similar idea to justify belief in normative truths, arguing that they are indispensable to deliberation.

The argument claims that deliberation is rationally non-optional because deliberating is required to act in the world. It further claims that the only way to make sense of deliberation is with normative truths. This is because deliberation seems to be a search for objectively right answers about the correct decision to make in a given situation. The argument concludes that it is justified to believe in normative truths. Counterarguments include the idea that deliberation does not require objectively right answers because it could be based on subjective desires, and that deliberation is not adequately connected to the truth to justify beliefs.

== Background ==
The deliberative indispensability argument is an argument for robust realism about normative and moral truths. These are truths about what people should do or think and what is valuable, like "we ought to give money to famine relief", "I should go on a diet", "pain is bad", and "you shouldn't form beliefs based on wishful thinking". Robust realism is the view that these normative and moral truths exist and are objective and irreducibly normative. In other words, they are true as a matter of fact—not a matter of personal preference or opinion—and they cannot be reduced to descriptive natural facts.

One argument against robust realism from Gilbert Harman is that moral truths cannot explain any empirical observations. Harman contrasted moral claims with scientific claims, like claims about electrons. According to Harman, the existence of electrons is required to explain various observations such as trails left in cloud chambers. In contrast, people's moral viewpoints can be explained by their upbringing and culture, so moral facts are not necessary to explain moral psychology or behavior.

David Enoch formulated the deliberative indispensability argument in part to respond to this point by Harman. It was inspired by other indispensability arguments from the philosophy of mathematics. These arguments often justify belief in mathematical objects like numbers based on mathematics' explanatory indispensability to science, but Enoch aimed to expand indispensability considerations beyond scientific explanation. He argued that normative truths are indispensable to deliberation and that deliberative indispensability is just as good an argument for their existence as explanatory indispensability would be.

== Argument ==
The argument is one example of an indispensability argument. In general, indispensability arguments assert that it is justified to believe something because it is indispensable for some purpose or project. In formulating his own version of the argument, Enoch considered why indispensability to explanation can support a conclusion but indispensability to other projects, like sorcery, cannot. He argued that explanation has a special status because it is a rationally non-optional project required to understand and act in the world. By contrast, attempts at sorcery are an optional project.

Enoch calls the rational non-optionality of projects intrinsic indispensability. He contrasts this with certain entities being indispensable to carry out a project successfully, which he calls instrumental indispensability. According to Enoch, both of these forms of indispensability are required for an indispensability argument to be successful. For example, Enoch claims that belief in electrons is justified because electrons are required for the project of scientific explanation (instrumental indispensability), and scientific explanation is rationally non-optional (intrinsic indispensability).

With this distinction in place, Enoch states the deliberative indispensability argument in Taking Morality Seriously as follows:

1. If something is instrumentally indispensable to an intrinsically indispensable project, then we are justified in believing that that thing exists.
2. The deliberative project is intrinsically indispensable.
3. Irreducibly normative truths are instrumentally indispensable to the deliberative project.
4. Therefore, we are justified in believing that there are irreducibly normative truths.

This argument relies on the idea that deliberative indispensability can justify beliefs in a similar way to explanatory indispensability. Enoch argues that explanation and deliberation are both rationally non-optional so both can support indispensability arguments. He challenges opponents of this idea to explain how explanation and deliberation are different so that only explanation can support indispensability arguments.

The argument also relies on the idea that irreducibly normative truths are indispensable to deliberation. Enoch states that deliberation is the attempt to find what it is best to do or think in a given situation. He argues that the act of deliberation assumes that there are right answers about what is the best thing to do, which can only be accounted for if there are irreducibly normative truths.

== Analysis and counterarguments ==
One area of debate about the argument concerns the idea that irreducibly normative truths are indispensable to deliberation. Enoch defended this by attempting to show that no other view can account for the experience of deliberating, which seems to be a search for objectively right decisions. In particular, he argues that normative truths searched for in deliberation must be irreducible because they are too different to be reduced to ordinary natural or scientific facts. An alternative view claims that deliberation is a search for correct answers based on subjective desires rather than objective truth. (Note: For an example of this type of counterargument, see Lenman 2013.) However, according to Enoch and others such as Thomas Nagel, it is often rational to question our desires so they alone cannot provide definitive answers to deliberation.

The deliberative indispensability argument is a pragmatic defense of deliberation as a source of true beliefs. It supports its conclusion on the basis that deliberation is of such great practical value that it is non-optional for rational beings. One advantage of this account is that it explains how deliberation can be a basic source of knowledge without leading to an infinite chain of justification; deliberation does not need any justification because it is rationally non-optional. One counterargument, however, argues that a pragmatic defense relying on practical value is not enough to justify beliefs, because justified beliefs require theoretical value and a method that is directed at the truth. (Note: For examples of this type of counterargument, see McPherson & Plunkett 2015 and Cline 2016.)

A related dispute is about whether deliberation uses a belief-forming method. One way of describing explanatory indispensability arguments is as justifying the use of inference to the best explanation as a basic belief-forming method because explanation is rationally non-optional. However, according to Alex Worsnip, Enoch did not provide an analogous belief-forming method used in deliberation, and therefore is missing a key element of an indispensability argument. Matt Lutz argues that the method justified by Enoch's deliberative indispensability argument is reliance on normative intuitions. This means that it is justified to use intuitions to form the belief that there are normative truths.

== See also ==
- Quine–Putnam indispensability argument – an indispensability argument in the philosophy of mathematics
