= Alexander Paseau =

British philosopher

- Born: Alexander Christopher Paseau

Education
- Education: Cambridge University (PhD, BA), Oxford University (BPhil), Princeton University

Philosophical work
- Era: 21st-century philosophy
- Region: Western philosophy
- Institutions: University of Oxford

Alexander Christopher Paseau is a British philosopher of Greek and Belgian origin. He is professor of mathematical philosophy at the University of Oxford and the Stuart Hampshire Fellow at Wadham College. He specialises in the philosophy of logic, the philosophy of mathematics, metaphysics, epistemology, and the philosophy of religion.

As of January 2025, he is editor-in-chief of The Journal for the Philosophy of Mathematics. He has been an Associate Editor of the journal Mind and has held Research Fellowships from the Mind Association and the Leverhulme Trust.

== Career ==
Paseau was educated at the University of Cambridge, where he gained a triple First in mathematics and a First in philosophy, as well as a PhD in philosophy; at the University of Oxford, where he took the BPhil; and at Princeton University, where he was a visiting graduate student under the supervision of David Lewis and Paul Benacerraf. He later obtained an MSc in economics from Birkbeck, University of London. He was a Research Fellow at Jesus College, Cambridge, from 2002 to 2005, before being appointed to his present position in 2005.

== Research work ==
Paseau subscribes to a broadly realist conception of mathematical truth, stating in an interview that "mathematical truth is not tensed. Mathematicians discover mathematical truths; they don’t make them up". In the same interview, Paseau also maintains that "inductive reasoning is crucial for mathematical knowledge" and that "we can know a mathematical truth without ever having proved it".

In their book One True Logic, Paseau and his co-author Griffiths argue that there is one correct foundational logic and that it is highly infinitary.

Paseau also works on the subtraction argument for metaphysical nihilism. Paseau's view is discussed and defended by Gonzalo Rodriguez-Pereyra in "The Subtraction Arguments for Metaphysical Nihilism: Compared and Defended".

== Books ==
- Mathematical Knowledge, co-editor with Mary Leng and Michael Potter, Oxford University Press 2007.
- Philosophy of Mathematics, (ed.), 5 volumes, Routledge 2017.
- One True Logic, with Owen Griffiths, Oxford University Press 2022.
- Indispensability, with Alan Baker, Cambridge University Press, 2023.
- The Euclidean Programme, with Wesley Wrigley, Cambridge University Press, 2024.
- Propositional Logic, MIT Press, forthcoming.
- What is Mathematics About?, Oxford University Press, forthcoming.
