= Jerusalem Review of Legal Studies =

- Discipline: Law
- Language: English
- Edited by: Alon Harel, Ori Herstein

Publication details
- History: 2010-present
- Publisher: Oxford University Press in collaborations with the Hebrew University of Jerusalem (Israel)
- Frequency: Biannually
- Open access: Hybrid

Standard abbreviations
- ISO 4: Jerus. Rev. Leg. Stud.

Indexing
- ISSN: 2219-7117
- LCCN: 2011247005
- OCLC no.: 724320323

Links
- Journal homepage; Online archive

The Jerusalem Review of Legal Studies is an English-language Israeli law journal covering books and research in legal theory. It is published by Oxford University Press in cooperation with the Hebrew University of Jerusalem. The editors-in-chief are Alon Harel and Ori Herstein. The journal is dedicated entirely to critical discussions of books or large research projects.

== History ==
The review was established in 2010 by David Enoch and Alon Harel. It was originally published by the Hebrew University law faculty. Since 2012, it has been published by Oxford University Press. As of January 2018, the journal is published online only.

The journal is based on symposia in which an author of a book or a research project is invited to respond to critical commentaries. The critical commentaries and the author's response are published in the same issue. Volumes 1-13 are abstracted and indexed by HeinOnline.

== See also ==
- Law in Israel
- Oxford Journal of Legal Studies
- Israel Law Review
