= Martin O'Neill (philosopher) =

British-Irish philosopher and academic

- Born: London
- Spouse: Mary Leng

Education
- Education: Balliol College, Oxford; Harvard University
- Thesis: Freedom, Fairness and Responsibility (2009)
- Doctoral advisors: T. M. Scanlon; Derek Parfit

Philosophical work
- Main interests: Political philosophy

Martin O'Neill is a British-Irish philosopher and author who is a professor of political philosophy in the Department of Philosophy at the University of York.

== Career ==
O'Neill read for a BA in Politics, Philosophy, and Economics and then a BPhil at Balliol College, University of Oxford. He read for a PhD in the Harvard University's Department of Philosophy, where he was supervised by Thomas Scanlon and Derek Parfit. His thesis, Freedom, Fairness and Responsibility, was submitted in 2009. He was a research fellow at St John's College, University of Cambridge between 2004 and 2007, and a Hallsworth Research Fellow at the University of Manchester from 2007 to 2009. He joined the University of York in 2010. He initially worked in the Department of Politics and International Relations, but moved to the Department of Philosophy in 2018.

== Personal life ==
O'Neill is originally from London, and is the son of Irish economic migrants. He holds UK and Irish citizenship. He is married to the philosopher Mary Leng; they have four children. O'Neill says that one of his "proudest achievements is ... raising four Arsenal fans in Yorkshire".

Alongside Elizabeth Kiss, Andrew Copson, and Martin Edwards, O'Neill was part of the Balliol College team that won the 2022 series of Christmas University Challenge.

== Selected bibliography ==
=== Books ===
- Property‐Owning Democracy: Rawls and Beyond. Blackwell, 2012, co-edited with Thad Williamson
- Taxation: Philosophical Perspectives. Oxford University Press, 2018, co-edited with Shepley Orr
- The Case for Community Wealth Building. Polity, 2020, with Joe Guinan

=== Articles ===
- O'Neill, Martin (2008). "What should egalitarians believe?". Philosophy & Public Affairs. 36 (2): 119–156. doi:10.1111/j.1088-4963.2008.00130.x.
- O'Neill, Martin (2009). "Liberty, Equality, and Property-Owning Democracy". Journal of Social Philosophy. 40 (3): 379–396. doi:10.1111/j.1467-9833.2009.01458.x.
- O'Neill, Martin (2017). "Philosophy and Public Policy after Piketty". Journal of Political Philosophy. 25 (3): 343–475. doi:10.1111/jopp.12129.
- O'Neill, Martin (2019). "Power, Predistribution, and Social Justice". Philosophy. 95 (1): 63–91. doi:10.1017/S0031819119000482.
