= Gordon Park Baker =

American philosopher

Gordon Park Baker (Englewood, New Jersey, 20 April 1938 – Woodstock, Oxfordshire, 25 June 2002) was an American-born English philosopher. His topics of interest included Ludwig Wittgenstein, Gottlob Frege, Friedrich Waismann, Bertrand Russell, the Vienna Circle, and René Descartes. He was noted for his collaboration with Peter Hacker and his disagreements with Michael Dummett.

== Biography ==
Baker was educated at Phillips Exeter Academy, Harvard University (major in mathematics), and, as a Marshall Scholar, at The Queen's College, Oxford, where he intended to read Philosophy, Politics, and Economics but transferred to Literae Humaniores (1960). He pursued his doctorate (1963–70) while teaching at the University of Kent and latterly as a Fellow of St John's College, Oxford.

He was a Trustee of the Waismann Fund.

His other interests included real tennis and the harpsichord.

He was married to Ann Pimlott (1964), with whom he had three sons: Alan, Geoffrey, and Nicholas. Alan is currently a professor of philosophy at Swarthmore College. From 1992 until Gordon Baker's death the philosopher Katherine Morris (Mansfield College, Oxford) was his acknowledged companion.

== Bibliography ==
- Wittgenstein: Understanding and Meaning, Volume 1 of an analytical commentary on the Philosophical Investigations (Blackwell, Oxford, and Chicago University Press, Chicago, 1980) (ISBN 0-631-12111-0) (ISBN 1-4051-0176-8) (ISBN 1-4051-1987-X), co-authored with P.M.S Hacker.
- Frege: Logical Excavations, (Blackwell, Oxford, O.U.P., N.Y., 1984) (ISBN 0-19-503261-6) co-authored with P.M.S Hacker.
- Language, Sense and Nonsense, a critical investigation into modern theories of language (Blackwell, 1984) (ISBN 0-631-13519-7) co-authored with P.M.S Hacker.
- Scepticism, Rules and Language (Blackwell, 1984) (ISBN 0-631-13614-2) co-authored with P.M.S Hacker.
- Wittgenstein: Rules, Grammar, and Necessity - Volume 2 of an analytical commentary on the Philosophical Investigations (Blackwell, Oxford, UK and Cambridge, Massachusetts USA, 1985) (ISBN 0-631-13024-1) (ISBN 0-631-16188-0) co-authored with P.M.S Hacker.
- Wittgenstein's Method: Neglected Aspects. Oxford: Blackwell, 2004. (ISBN 978-1405152808), posthumously edited and published by Katherine J. Morris.

== See also ==
- American philosophy
