= Joseph Melia =

Philosopher

Joseph Melia is a philosopher working in the areas of philosophy of mathematics, modal logic and possible worlds. He has made important contributions to the debate over the Quine–Putnam indispensability argument, where he argues for a "weaseling" approach to mathematical nominalism. He has also argued against modalism and the modal realism of David Lewis.
