= Metascience (journal) =

- Discipline: Multidisciplinary humanities
- Language: English
- Edited by: K. Brad Wray; Jonathan Simon

Publication details
- History: 1992–present
- Publisher: Springer Nature
- Frequency: Triannually

Standard abbreviations
- ISO 4: Metascience

Indexing
- ISSN: 0815-0796 (print); 1467-9981 (web)
- LCCN: 93650333

Links
- Journal homepage

Metascience is a triannual peer-reviewed academic journal published by Springer Nature. It publishes reviews of books in the history and philosophy of science and science and technology studies.

It was established in 1984 by the Australasian Association for the History, Philosophy and Social Studies of Science, and re-established in 1991 as a new series of the journal, with the new subtitle An International Review Journal for the History, Philosophy and Social Studies of Science, by Michael Shortland. Operations for the journal moved in 2017 from the philosophy department of the State University of New York at Oswego to the Centre for Science Studies at Aarhus University.

As of 2021, the editors-in-chief are K. Brad Wray of Aarhus University and Jonathan Simon of the University of Lorraine. The journal is abstracted and indexed in Scopus.

== See also ==
- Metascience
