= Paraconsistent mathematics =

Paraconsistent mathematics, sometimes called inconsistent mathematics, represents an attempt to develop the classical infrastructure of mathematics (e.g. analysis) based on a foundation of paraconsistent logic instead of classical logic. A number of reformulations of analysis can be developed, for example functions which both do and do not have a given value simultaneously.

Chris Mortensen claims (see references):

One could hardly ignore the examples of analysis and its special case, the calculus. There prove to be many places where there are distinctive inconsistent insights; see Mortensen (1995) for example. (1) Robinson's non-standard analysis was based on infinitesimals, quantities smaller than any real number, as well as their reciprocals, the infinite numbers. This has an inconsistent version, which has some advantages for calculation in being able to discard higher-order infinitesimals. The theory of differentiation turned out to have these advantages, while the theory of integration did not. (2)
