= Useful fiction =

Useful fiction may refer to:

- Fictionalism, a view in philosophy
- Noble lie, a concept in social psychology
