= David Enoch (philosopher) =

Israeli philosopher

- דוד אנוך
- Born: 1971 (age 54–55)

Education
- Education: Tel Aviv University (B.A., LL.B.); New York University (PhD)
- Thesis: A Defense of Robust Meta-Normative Realism (2003)
- Doctoral advisors: Derek Parfit, Thomas Nagel, Hartry Field

Philosophical work
- Era: Contemporary philosophy
- Region: Western philosophy
- School: Analytic
- Institutions: Hebrew University of Jerusalem University of Oxford
- Main interests: Moral philosophy, political philosophy, philosophy of law
- Notable works: Taking Morality Seriously (2011)
- Notable ideas: Meta-ethical robust realism, deliberative indispensability argument
- Website: Personal website

David Enoch (Hebrew: דוד אנוך; born 1971) is an Israeli ethicist and philosopher of law with research interests in moral, political and legal philosophy within the analytic tradition. He is the co-director of the Center for Moral and Political Philosophy and has been the Rodney Blackman Chair in the Philosophy of Law at the Hebrew University of Jerusalem since 2005. He is Professor of the Philosophy of Law at the University of Oxford. He received his Bachelor of Arts in philosophy and Bachelor of Laws degrees from Tel Aviv University in 1993. He then completed his PhD in philosophy at New York University in 2003.

Enoch is a member of the Israeli Law Professors' Forum for Democracy, established in 2023 to analyze and address of the various reforms proposed by Israel’s 37th Government to change Israel’s democratic regime.

== Philosophy ==
In metaethics, Enoch defends "robust realism", the view according to which there are objective, universal, non-natural moral truths, truths that when successful in our moral inquiries we discover rather than create, that do not constitutively depend on us and our dispositions. He uses two positive arguments for robust realism: one from the impartiality of morality and the other from the deliberative indispensability of moral truths.

In political philosophy, Enoch criticizes Rawlsian versions of liberalism, and is developing a non-Rawlsian liberalism, that is sensitive to the concerns of the real world, and that attempts to incorporate the insights of liberalism’s critics.

In legal philosophy, Enoch criticizes common ways of doing general jurisprudence, and works on specific normative questions concerning the law, for instance, when it comes to moral and legal luck, or to the status of statistical evidence.

In ethics, Enoch defends moral deference, and the views that consent should be understood contrastively, that a distinction within the value of autonomy helps to clarify the status of hypothetical consent, and that the intending-foreseeing distinction is suspicious – especially when applied to state action.

== Bibliography ==
- Enoch, David (28 July 2011). Taking Morality Seriously. Oxford University Press. doi:10.1093/acprof:oso/9780199579969.001.0001. ISBN 978-0-19-957996-9.
