= Mark Colyvan =

Australian philosopher

- Awards: Humboldt Fellow, ARC Future Fellowship

Education
- Thesis: Indispensability arguments in the philosophy of mathematics (1998)
- Doctoral advisor: J. J. C. Smart

Philosophical work
- Era: 21st-century philosophy
- Region: Western philosophy
- School: Analytic
- Institutions: University of Sydney
- Main interests: Philosophy of logic, philosophy of mathematics, conservation biology
- Website: http://www.colyvan.com/

Mark Colyvan is an Australian philosopher and Professor of Philosophy at the University of Sydney. He is a former president of the Australasian Association of Philosophy. Colyvan is known for his research on philosophy of mathematics.

== Books ==
- The Indispensability of Mathematics, Oxford University Press, 2001
- Ecological Orbits: How Planets Move and Populations Grow, Oxford University Press, 2004
- An Introduction to the Philosophy of Mathematics, Cambridge University Press, 2012
