= Hartry Field =

American philosopher

- Born: 30 November 1946 (age 79)

Education
- Education: University of Wisconsin; Harvard University
- Doctoral advisor: Hilary Putnam

Philosophical work
- Era: Contemporary philosophy
- Region: Western philosophy
- School: Analytic; Mathematical fictionalism
- Main interests: Philosophy of science, philosophy of mathematics, epistemology, philosophy of mind
- Notable ideas: Mathematical fictionalism, epistemic rejectionism

Hartry Hamlin Field (born November 30, 1946) is an American philosopher. He is Silver Professor of Philosophy at New York University; he is a notable contributor to philosophy of science, philosophy of mathematics, epistemology, and philosophy of mind.

== Early life and education ==
Hartry Hamlin Field was born on November 30, 1946, in Boston, Massachusetts, to Adelaide (née Anderson) and Donald Field. Field earned a B.A. in mathematics from the University of Wisconsin–Madison in 1967 and an M.A. in philosophy from Harvard University in 1968. He earned his Ph.D. in philosophy from Harvard in 1972 under the direction of Hilary Putnam and Richard Boyd.

== Academic career ==
He taught first at Princeton University, and then at the University of Southern California and City University of New York Graduate Center before joining the NYU faculty in 1997, where he is currently Silver Professor of Philosophy.

Field was elected Fellow of the American Academy of Arts and Sciences in 2003 and is also a past winner of the Lakatos Prize in 1986. He delivered the 2008 John Locke Lectures at the University of Oxford. In 2012, he was appointed Distinguished Research Professor at the University of Birmingham in the UK.

== Philosophical work ==
Field's first work was a commentary on Alfred Tarski's theory of truth, which he has worked on since 1972. His current view on this matter is in favor of a deflationary theory of truth. His most influential work produced in this period is probably "Theory Change and the Indeterminacy of Reference" (Journal of Philosophy, 70(14): 462–481), in which he introduced the concept of partial denotation.

In the 1980s, Field started a project in the philosophy of mathematics in support of mathematical fictionalism, the doctrine that all mathematical statements are merely useful fictions, and should not be taken to be literally true. More precisely, Field aimed to produce reconstructions of science that would remove all reference to mathematical entities, hence showing that mathematics is dispensable to science in opposition to the Quine–Putnam indispensability argument.

Much of his current work is in semantic paradoxes. In 2008, he gave the John Locke Lectures, entitled "Logic, Normativity, and Rational Revisability".

== Books ==
- Science Without Numbers, Blackwell, 1980
- Realism, Mathematics and Modality, Blackwell, 1989
- Truth and the Absence of Fact, Oxford University Press 2001
- Saving Truth from Paradox, Oxford University Press, 2008

== See also ==
- American philosophy
- List of American philosophers
- New York University Department of Philosophy
