= Mary Leng =

British philosopher

Mary Leng is a British philosopher specialising in the philosophy of mathematics and philosophy of science. She is a professor at the University of York.

== Career ==
Leng studied as an undergraduate at Balliol College, University of Oxford and as postgraduate student at the University of Toronto. She worked at the University of Cambridge from 2002 to 2006, and then the University of Liverpool from 2006 to 2011. In 2007, she co-edited a collection called Mathematical Knowledge with Alexander Paseau and Michael Potter, which was published by Oxford University Press, and, in 2010, she published a monograph called Mathematics and Reality, again with Oxford University Press. In Mathematics and Reality, Leng defends mathematical fictionalism. Leng joined the University of York in 2012, where she is now a professor.

== Personal life ==
She is married to the philosopher Martin O'Neill; they have four children.
