= Penelope Maddy =

American mathematician and philosopher

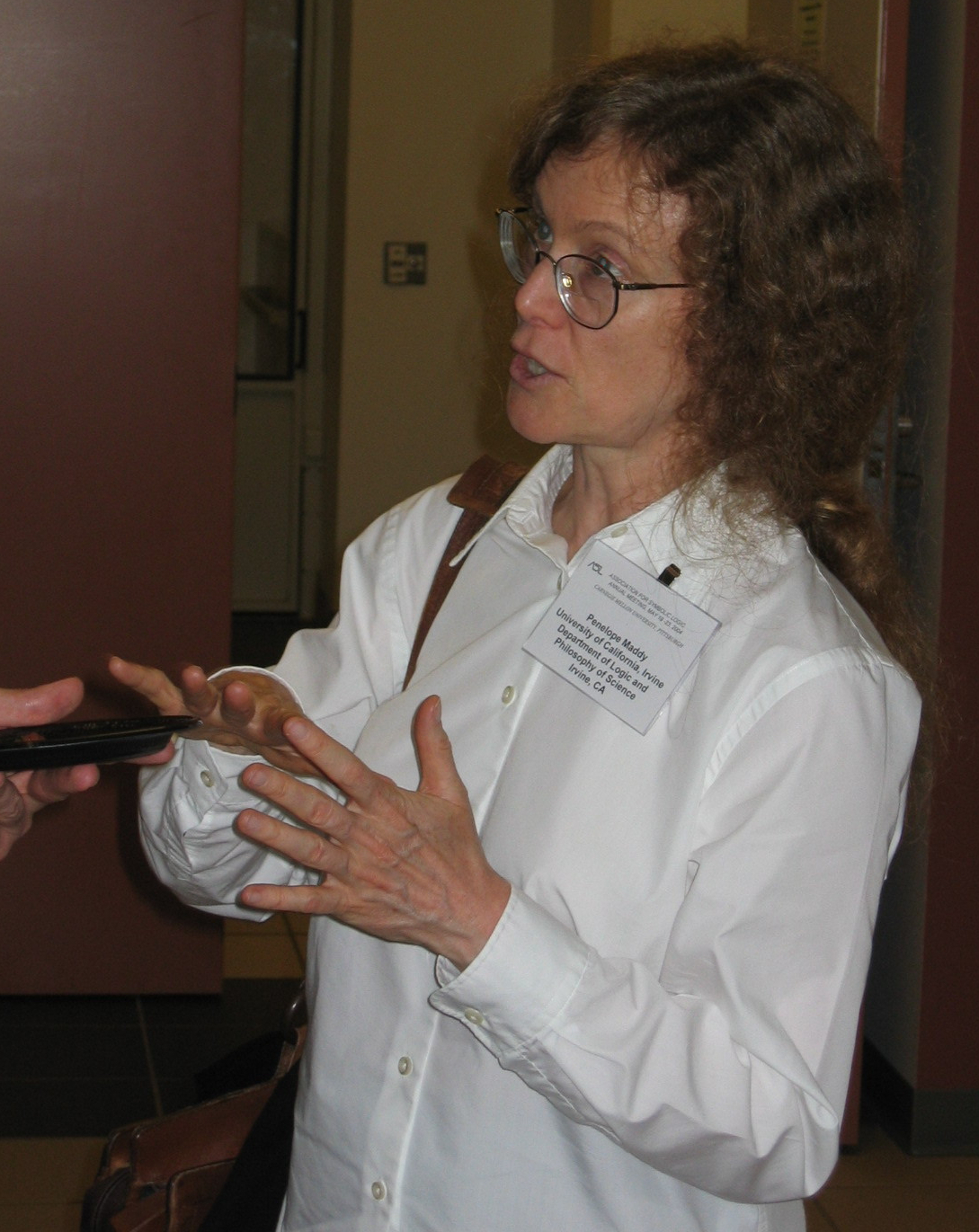
- Maddy in 2004
- Born: July 4, 1950 (age 75); Tulsa, Oklahoma, U.S.

Education
- Education: University of California, Berkeley (BA, 1972); Princeton University (PhD, 1979)
- Thesis: Set Theoretical Realism (1979)
- Doctoral advisor: John P. Burgess

Philosophical work
- Era: Contemporary philosophy
- Region: Western philosophy
- School: Analytic philosophy
- Institutions: University of California, Irvine
- Main interests: Philosophy of mathematics
- Notable ideas: Set-theoretic realism (also known as naturalized Platonism), mathematical naturalism

Penelope Maddy (born 4 July 1950) is an American philosopher who is Distinguished Professor Emerita of Logic and Philosophy of Science and of Mathematics at the University of California, Irvine. She is well known for her influential work in the philosophy of mathematics, where she has worked on mathematical realism (especially set-theoretic realism) and mathematical naturalism.

== Education and career ==
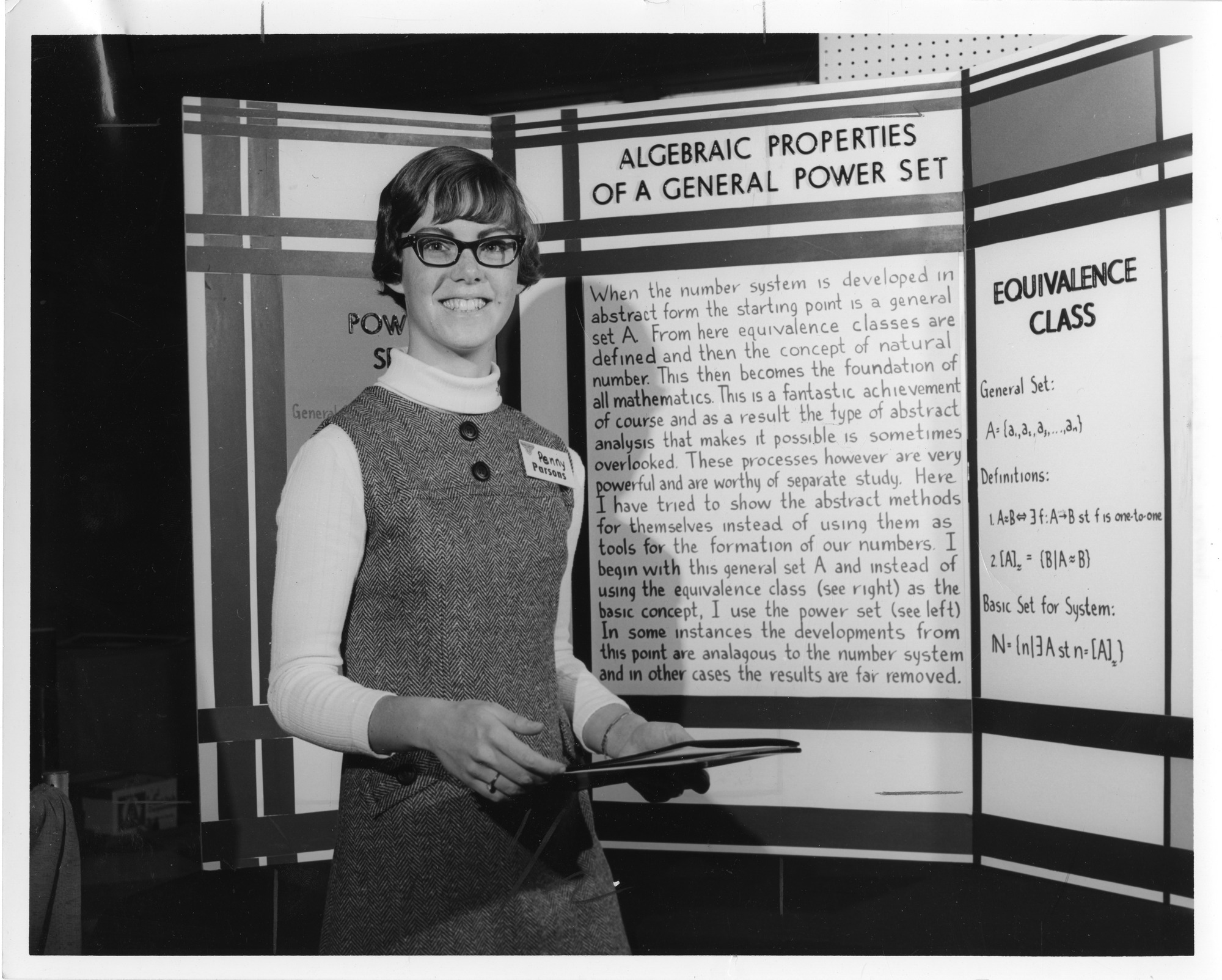
Maddy standing in front of her Science Talent Search exhibit, March 1968

Maddy first became interested in mathematics in her first algebra class in middle school. After being given a book on abstract algebra by her teacher, she entered the 1968 Westinghouse Science Talent Search, becoming a finalist and placing seventh overall. She went on to study mathematics at University of California, Berkeley and received her bachelor's degree in 1972.

Maddy's interest in the continuum hypothesis—which she had initially learned of during high school—and the fact that it could not be proved without introducing a new axiom, led her to question what could count as evidence for one axiom over another. According to Maddy, at this point she was "already well down the slippery slope from mathematics to philosophy" and she went to pursue a PhD in philosophy at Princeton University. She received her PhD in 1979. Her dissertation, Set Theoretical Realism, was supervised by John P. Burgess.

She taught at the University of Notre Dame and University of Illinois, Chicago before joining University of California, Irvine in 1987. There she held positions as the chair of the philosophy department and later as the founding chair of the department of logic and philosophy of science. She was named Chancellor's Professor in 2002 and Distinguished Professor in 2007. She retired in 2020. She is Distinguished Professor Emeritus.

She was elected a Fellow of the American Academy of Arts and Sciences in 1998. She won the 2002 Lakatos Award for her 1997 book Naturalism in Mathematics. The German Mathematical Society awarded her a Gauss Lectureship in 2006. She was the president of the Association for Symbolic Logic from 2007 to 2009, during which time she oversaw the launch of the Review of Symbolic Logic. She was president of the Pacific division of the American Philosophical Association from 2019-2020.

== Philosophical work ==
Maddy's early work, culminating in Realism in Mathematics, defended Kurt Gödel's position that mathematics is a true description of a mind-independent realm that we can access through our intuition. However, she suggested that some mathematical entities are in fact concrete, unlike, notably, Gödel, who assumed all mathematical objects are abstract. She suggested that sets can be causally efficacious, and in fact share all the causal and spatiotemporal properties of their elements. Thus, when one sees three cups on a table, one also sees the set. She used contemporary work in cognitive science and psychology to support this position, pointing out that just as at a certain age we begin to see objects rather than mere sense perceptions, there is also a certain age at which we begin to see sets rather than just objects.

In the 1990s, she moved away from this position, towards a position described in Naturalism in Mathematics. Her "naturalist" position, like Quine's, suggests that since science is our most successful project so far for knowing about the world, philosophers should adopt the methods of science in their own discipline, and especially when discussing science. As Maddy stated in an interview, "If you're a 'naturalist', you think that science shouldn't be held to extra-scientific standards, that it doesn't require extra-scientific ratification." However, rather than a unified picture of the sciences like Quine's, her picture has mathematics as separate. That is, mathematics is neither supported nor undermined by the needs and goals of science but is allowed to obey its own criteria. This means that traditional metaphysical and epistemological concerns of the philosophy of mathematics are misplaced. Like Wittgenstein, she suggests that many of these puzzles arise merely because of the application of language outside its proper domain of significance.

She has been dedicated to understanding and explaining the methods that set theorists use in agreeing on axioms, especially those that go beyond ZFC.

== Selected publications ==
- Maddy, Penelope (June 1988). "Believing the Axioms, I". Journal of Symbolic Logic. 53 (2): 481–511. doi:10.2307/2274520. JSTOR 2274520. (a copy with corrections is available at the author's web page)
- Maddy, Penelope (September 1988). "Believing the Axioms, II". Journal of Symbolic Logic. 53 (3): 736–764. doi:10.2307/2274569. JSTOR 2274569. S2CID 16544090.
- Realism in Mathematics, Oxford University Press, 1990. ISBN 0-19-824035-X
- Naturalism in Mathematics, Oxford University Press, 1997. ISBN 0-19-825075-4
- Second Philosophy, Oxford University Press, 2007. ISBN 0-19-927366-9
- Defending the Axioms, Oxford University Press, 2011. ISBN 0-19-959618-2
- The Logical Must, Oxford University Press, 2014.
- What do Philosophers Do? Skepticism and the Practice of Philosophy, Oxford University Press, 2017. ISBN 9-78-019061869-8
- A Plea for Natural Philosophy and Other Essays, Oxford University Press, 2022.

== See also ==
- Cabal (set theory)
