= Alan Baker (philosopher) =

American philosopher

Alan R. Baker is a professor of philosophy in Swarthmore College (Pennsylvania, United States), specializing in the philosophy of mathematics and the philosophy of science. In 2026, he was the recipient of a Guggenheim Fellowship. Baker is also a former U.S. shogi champion.

== Academic career ==
Baker did his undergraduate studies at the University of Cambridge, earning a bachelor's degree in philosophy with first class honours in 1991. He then moved to the U.S. for graduate school, earning a master's degree in 1995 and a Ph.D. in 1999, both in philosophy from Princeton University. His doctoral supervisors were Paul Benacerraf and Gideon Rosen. After working as an assistant professor at Xavier University, he moved to Swarthmore in 2003.

Philosophically, Baker is a mathematical realist who has used examples from evolutionary biology to show the necessity of mathematics in scientific reasoning.

In 2005 The New York Times published an excerpt from the exam from his "Introduction to Metaphysics and Epistemology" course in its "pop quiz" column.

== Shogi ==
In 2005, Baker founded a shogi club at Swarthmore College, outside Philadelphia, which is one of only two college-based shogi clubs in the United States. The other club is Cornell University Shogi Club, which was founded in August 2017.

Baker is also a former U.S. shogi champion, having won the 13th U.S. Shogi Championship in 2008. As of January 2017, his ELO rating of 2107 placed him in 20th place on the Federation of European Shogi Associations (FESA) bi-annual rating list. Since 2017, Baker has been captain of the United States 1st Team in the A Division of the online World Shogi League. Under his captaincy, the time has won the division twice, most recently in 2025.

Tournament results:

- 2008: Winner, 13th U.S. Shogi Championship.
- 2008: 3rd place, Individual Tournament, 4th International Shogi Forum (Tendō).
- 2009: 2nd place, British Open Shogi Championship.
- 2014: Winner, Group B Individual Tournament, 6th International Shogi Forum (Shizuoka)

== Personal life ==
Baker's father was British philosopher Gordon Park Baker.
