= Mathematics, Form and Function =

Book on philosophy of mathematics

Mathematics, Form and Function, a book published in 1986 by Springer-Verlag, is a survey of the whole of mathematics, including its origins and deep structure, by the American mathematician Saunders Mac Lane.

== Mathematics and human activities ==
Throughout his book, and especially in chapter I.11, Mac Lane informally discusses how mathematics is grounded in more ordinary concrete and abstract human activities. The following table is adapted from one given on p. 35 of Mac Lane (1986). The rows are very roughly ordered from most to least fundamental. For a bullet list that can be compared and contrasted with this table, see section 3 of Where Mathematics Comes From.

Human Activity	Related Mathematical Idea	Mathematical Technique
Collecting	Object Collection	Set; class; multiset; list; family
Connecting	Cause and effect	ordered pair; relation; function; operation
	Proximity; connection	Topological space; mereotopology
Following	Successive actions	Function composition; transformation group
Comparing	Enumeration	Bijection; cardinal number; order
Timing	Before & After	Linear order
Counting	Successor	Successor function; ordinal number
Computing	Operations on numbers	Addition, multiplication recursively defined; abelian group; rings
Looking at objects	Symmetry	Symmetry group; invariance; isometries
Building; shaping	Shape; point	Sets of points; geometry; pi
Rearranging	Permutation	Bijection; permutation group
Selecting; distinguishing	Parthood	Subset; order; lattice theory; mereology
Arguing	Proof	First-order logic
Measuring	Distance; extent	Rational number; metric space
Endless repetition	Infinity; Recursion	Recursive set; Infinite set
Estimating	Approximation	Real number; real field
Moving through space & time:	curvature	calculus; differential geometry
--Without cycling	Change	Real analysis; transformation group
--With cycling	Repetition	pi; trigonometry; complex number; complex analysis
--Both		Differential equations; mathematical physics
Motion through time alone	Growth & decay	e; exponential function; natural logarithms;
Altering shapes	Deformation	Differential geometry; topology
Observing patterns	Abstraction	Axiomatic set theory; universal algebra; category theory; morphism
Seeking to do better	Optimization	Operations research; optimal control theory; dynamic programming
Choosing; gambling	Chance	Probability theory; mathematical statistics; measure

Also see the related diagrams appearing on the following pages of Mac Lane (1986): 149, 184, 306, 408, 416, 422-28.

Mac Lane (1986) cites a related monograph by Lars Gårding (1977).

== Mac Lane's relevance to the philosophy of mathematics ==
Mac Lane cofounded category theory with Samuel Eilenberg, which enables a unified treatment of mathematical structures and of the relations among them, at the cost of breaking away from their cognitive grounding. Nevertheless, his views—however informal—are a valuable contribution to the philosophy and anthropology of mathematics. His views anticipate, in some respects, the more detailed account of the cognitive basis of mathematics given by George Lakoff and Rafael E. Núñez in their Where Mathematics Comes From. Lakoff and Núñez argue that mathematics emerges via conceptual metaphors grounded in the human body, its motion through space and time, and in human sense perceptions.

== See also ==
- 1986 in philosophy
