= Unreasonable ineffectiveness of mathematics =

Viewpoint about applied mathematical analysis

The unreasonable ineffectiveness of mathematics is a phrase that alludes to the article by physicist Eugene Wigner, "The Unreasonable Effectiveness of Mathematics in the Natural Sciences". This phrase is meant to suggest that mathematical analysis has not proved as valuable in other fields as it has in physics.

== Life sciences ==
I. M. Gelfand, a mathematician who worked in biomathematics and molecular biology, as well as many other fields in applied mathematics, is quoted as stating,

Eugene Wigner wrote a famous essay on the unreasonable effectiveness of mathematics in natural sciences. He meant physics, of course. There is only one thing which is more unreasonable than the unreasonable effectiveness of mathematics in physics, and this is the unreasonable ineffectiveness of mathematics in biology.

An opposing view is given by Leonard Adleman, a theoretical computer scientist who pioneered the field of DNA computing. In Adleman's view, "Sciences reach a point where they become mathematized", starting at the fringes but eventually "the central issues in the field become sufficiently understood that they can be thought about mathematically. It occurred in physics about the time of the Renaissance; it began in chemistry after John Dalton developed atomic theory" and by the 1990s was taking place in biology. By the early 1990s, "Biology was no longer the science of things that smelled funny in refrigerators (my view from undergraduate days in the 1960s). The field was undergoing a revolution and was rapidly acquiring the depth and power previously associated exclusively with the physical sciences. Biology was now the study of information stored in DNA – strings of four letters: A, T, G, and C and the transformations that information undergoes in the cell. There was mathematics here!"

== Economics and finance ==
K. Vela Velupillai wrote of The unreasonable ineffectiveness of mathematics in economics. To him "the headlong rush with which economists have equipped themselves with a half-baked knowledge of mathematical traditions has led to an un-natural mathematical economics and a non-numerical economic theory." His argument is built on the claim that

mathematical economics is unreasonably ineffective. Unreasonable, because the mathematical assumptions are economically unwarranted; ineffective because the mathematical formalisations imply non-constructive and uncomputable structures. A reasonable and effective mathematisation of economics entails Diophantine formalisms. These come with natural undecidabilities and uncomputabilities. In the face of this, [the] conjecture [is] that an economics for the future will be freer to explore experimental methodologies underpinned by alternative mathematical structures.

Sergio M. Focardi and Frank J. Fabozzi, on the other hand, have acknowledged that "economic science is generally considered less viable than the physical sciences" and that "sophisticated mathematical models of the economy have been developed but their accuracy is questionable to the point that the 2008 financial crisis is often blamed on an unwarranted faith in faulty mathematical models". They nevertheless claim that

the mathematical handling of economics has actually been reasonably successful and that models are not the cause behind the [erstwhile] crisis. The science of economics does not study immutable laws of nature but the complex human artefacts that are our economies and our financial markets, artefacts that are designed to be largely uncertain ... and therefore models can only be moderately accurate. Still, our mathematical models offer a valuable design tool to engineer our economic systems. But the mathematics of economics and finance cannot be that of physics. The mathematics of economics and finance is the mathematics of learning and complexity, similar to the mathematics used in studying biological or ecological systems.

A more general comment by Irving Fisher is that:

The contention often met with that the mathematical formulation of economic problems gives a picture of theoretical exactitude untrue to actual life is absolutely correct. But, to my mind, this is not an objection but a very definite advantage, for it brings out the principles in such sharp relief that it enables us to put our finger definitely on the points where the picture is untrue to real life.

== Cognitive sciences ==
Roberto Poli of McGill University delivered a number of lectures entitled The unreasonable ineffectiveness of mathematics in cognitive sciences in 1999. The abstract is:

My argument is that it is possible to gain better understanding of the "unreasonable effectiveness" of mathematics in study of the physical world only when we have understood the equally "unreasonable ineffectiveness" of mathematics in the cognitive sciences (and, more generally, in all the forms of knowledge that cannot be reduced to knowledge about physical phenomena. Biology, psychology, economics, ethics, and history are all cases in which it has hitherto proved impossible to undertake an intrinsic mathematicization even remotely comparable to the analysis that has been so fruitful in physics.) I will consider some conceptual issues that might prove important for framing the problem of cognitive mathematics (= mathematics for the cognitive sciences), namely the problem of n-dynamics, of identity, of timing, and of the specious present. The above analyses will be conducted from a partly unusual perspective regarding the problem of the foundations of mathematics.

== See also ==
- Quasi-empiricism in mathematics
