= Rafael Núñez (disambiguation) =

Rafael Núñez (1825–1894) was president of Colombia in the 1880s and 1890s.

Rafael Núñez may also refer to:

- Rafael E. Núñez, cognitive scientist at the University of California, San Diego
- Rafael Núñez (footballer) (born 2002), Dominican footballer

== See also ==
- Rafael Núñez International Airport, an airport in Cartagena, Colombia
