= Quasi-empiricism in mathematics =

In philosophy of mathematics, quasi-empiricism is the attempt to direct philosophers' attention to mathematical practice, in particular, relations with physics, social sciences, and computational mathematics, rather than solely to issues in the foundations of mathematics. Of concern to this discussion are several topics: the relationship of empiricism (see Penelope Maddy) with mathematics, issues related to realism, the importance of culture, necessity of application, etc.

== Primary arguments ==
A primary argument with respect to quasi-empiricism is that whilst mathematics and physics are frequently considered to be closely linked fields of study, this may reflect human cognitive bias. It is claimed that, despite rigorous application of appropriate empirical methods or mathematical practice in either field, this would nonetheless be insufficient to disprove alternate approaches.

Eugene Wigner (1960) noted that this culture need not be restricted to mathematics, physics, or even humans. He stated further that "The miracle of the appropriateness of the language of mathematics for the formulation of the laws of physics is a wonderful gift which we neither understand nor deserve. We should be grateful for it and hope that it will remain valid in future research and that it will extend, for better or for worse, to our pleasure, even though perhaps also to our bafflement, to wide branches of learning." Wigner used several examples to demonstrate why 'bafflement' is an appropriate description, such as showing how mathematics adds to situational knowledge in ways that are either not possible otherwise or are so outside normal thought to be of little notice. The predictive ability, in the sense of describing potential phenomena prior to observation of such, which can be supported by a mathematical system would be another example.

Following up on Wigner, Richard Hamming (1980) wrote about applications of mathematics as a central theme to this topic and suggested that successful use can sometimes trump proof, in the following sense: where a theorem has evident veracity through applicability, later evidence that shows the theorem's proof to be problematic would result more in trying to firm up the theorem rather than in trying to redo the applications or to deny results obtained to date. Hamming had four explanations for the 'effectiveness' that we see with mathematics and definitely saw this topic as worthy of discussion and study.

1. "We see what we look for." Why 'quasi' is apropos in reference to this discussion.
2. "We select the kind of mathematics to use." Our use and modification of mathematics are essentially situational and goal-driven.
3. "Science in fact answers comparatively few problems." What still needs to be looked at is a larger set.
4. "The evolution of man provided the model." There may be limits attributable to the human element.

For Willard Van Orman Quine (1960), existence is only existence in a structure. This position is relevant to quasi-empiricism because Quine believes that the same evidence that supports theorizing about the structure of the world is the same as the evidence supporting theorizing about mathematical structures.

Hilary Putnam (1975) stated that mathematics had accepted informal proofs and proof by authority, and had made and corrected errors all through its history. Also, he stated that Euclid's system of proving geometry theorems was unique to the classical Greeks and did not evolve similarly in other mathematical cultures in China, India, and Arabia. This and other evidence led many mathematicians to reject the label of Platonists, along with Plato's ontology – which, along with the methods and epistemology of Aristotle, had served as a foundation ontology for the Western world since its beginnings. A truly international culture of mathematics would, Putnam and others (1983) argued, necessarily be at least 'quasi'-empirical (embracing 'the scientific method' for consensus if not experiment).

Imre Lakatos (1976), who did his original work on this topic for his dissertation (1961, Cambridge), argued for 'research programs' as a means to support a basis for mathematics and considered thought experiments as appropriate to mathematical discovery. Lakatos may have been the first to use 'quasi-empiricism' in the context of this subject.

== See also ==
- Entscheidungsproblem
- Charles Sanders Peirce
- Karl Popper
- Philosophy of mathematics § Beyond the traditional schools
- Postmodern mathematics
- Thomas Tymoczko
- Unreasonable ineffectiveness of mathematics
