= Mark Steiner =

Israeli philosopher (1942–2020)

- מארק שטיינר
- Born: May 6, 1942; The Bronx, New York, US
- Died: April 6, 2020 (aged 77); Shaare Zedek Medical Center, Israel
- Education: Columbia University (1965), Ph.D. from Princeton University (1972)
- Occupation: Professor of philosophy
- Employer: Hebrew University of Jerusalem
- Known for: Writing The Applicability of Mathematics as a Philosophical Problem

Mark Steiner (Hebrew: מארק שטיינר; May 6, 1942 – April 6, 2020) was an American-born Israeli professor of philosophy. He taught philosophy of mathematics and philosophy of physics at the Hebrew University of Jerusalem. Steiner died after contracting COVID-19 during the COVID-19 pandemic.

== Biography ==
Mark Steiner was born in the Bronx, New York. He graduated from Columbia University in 1965 and studied at the University of Oxford as a Fulbright Fellow. He then received his Ph.D. in philosophy from Princeton University in 1972 after completing a doctoral dissertation titled "On mathematical knowledge." Steiner taught at Columbia from 1970 to 1977.

Steiner died on April 6, 2020, in Shaare Zedek Medical Center, after contracting the COVID-19 virus during the COVID-19 pandemic in Israel.

== Academic career ==
Steiner is best known for his book The Applicability of Mathematics as a Philosophical Problem, in which he attempted to explain the historical utility of mathematics in physics. The book may be considered an extended meditation on the issues raised by Eugene Wigner's article "The Unreasonable Effectiveness of Mathematics in the Natural Sciences". Steiner is also the author of the book Mathematical Knowledge.

Steiner also translated Reuven Agushewitz's philosophical work Emune un Apikorses from Yiddish.

== Bibliography ==
- Steiner, Mark (1975). Mathematical knowledge. Ithaca: Cornell University Press. ISBN 0801408946.
- Steiner, Mark (1998). The applicability of mathematics as a philosophical problem. Cambridge, MA: Harvard University Press. ISBN 9780674043985.

=== Festschrift ===
- Ben-Menahem, Yemima; Corry, Leo; Posy, Carl, eds. (2012). Mathematical knowledge and its applications : in honor of Mark Steiner. Jerusalem: S.H. Bergman Center for Philosophical Studies, the Faculty of Humanities at the Hebrew University of Jerusalem.
