= Paul Ernest =

American philosopher and educational theorist (born 1944)

- Born: 1944 (age 81–82); New York City, U.S.
- Education: University of Sussex (BSc) Bedford College, London (MSc) King's College, London (PhD)
- Known for: Social constructivist philosophy of mathematics Philosophy of mathematics education Founding the Philosophy of Mathematics Education Journal
- Awards: Fellow of the Royal Society of Arts (1996) Fellow of the Institute of Mathematics and its Applications (1986)
- Scientific career
- Fields: Philosophy of mathematics, Mathematics education
- Workplaces: University of Exeter
- Doctoral advisor: Moshé Machover
- Doctoral students: Valsa Koshy Simon Goodchild Chap Sam Lim

Paul Ernest (born 1944) is a British-American philosopher and educational theorist known for his foundational work in the philosophy of mathematics education and for developing a social constructivist philosophy of mathematics. He is an Emeritus Professor at the University of Exeter and the founding editor of the Philosophy of Mathematics Education Journal.

== Life and education ==
Paul Ernest was born in New York City in 1944, the son of the constructivist artist John Ernest and the clinical psychologist Elna Ernest (née Adlerbert). He moved to London with his family in 1951.

Ernest's early academic path was non-linear. After a period of travel and various jobs, he completed his Bachelor of Science degree in Mathematics and Logic at the University of Sussex in 1973. He then earned a Master of Science in Mathematics (with Distinction) from Bedford College, London University, in 1974, and a PhD in the Philosophy of Mathematics from King's College, London, in 1985, under the supervision of Moshé Machover.

Before completing his doctorate, Ernest began his career as a mathematics teacher at Hampstead Comprehensive School in London (1976–1979). He subsequently moved into teacher education, holding posts at Homerton College, Cambridge (1979–1981), Bedford College of Higher Education (1981–1982), and the University of the West Indies in Jamaica (1982–1984). In 1984, he was appointed to a lectureship at the University of Exeter, where he was promoted to a personal chair as Professor of the Philosophy of Mathematics Education in 1998. He became an Emeritus Professor in 2005.

Ernest has held visiting professorships at several international institutions, including the National Technical University of Norway, Trondheim, University of Oslo, Brunel University, and Liverpool Hope University.

== Published contributions ==
Ernest's published work spans over three hundred books, chapters, and journal articles. His contributions can be broadly characterized in three overlapping phases.

=== Early phase: Pedagogy and content ===
Ernest's early work, emerging from his teaching practice, focused on practical aspects of mathematics education. He wrote extensively on pedagogical strategies such as problem-solving, investigational work, small group work, and the use of games in teaching. He was also an early advocate for the use of computers in the classroom, exploring the potential of the Logo programming language to develop problem-solving skills and new approaches to teaching geometry. He also explored the teaching of specific mathematical content, including the use of number lines, mathematical induction, and incorporating the history of mathematics into the classroom with topics like Egyptian fractions. A key early concern was beginning to relate the philosophy of mathematics to its teaching, laying the groundwork for his later theoretical work.

=== Middle phase: Belief systems, social constructivism, and critical mathematics education ===
This period marks the development of Ernest's most influential theoretical contributions. A major focus was the role of teachers' beliefs and belief systems. His 1989 paper, "The Knowledge, Beliefs and Attitudes of the Mathematics Teacher: A Model", which has been cited over 1,800 times, became a cornerstone for research on teacher cognition. This work provided a detailed framework for understanding how teachers' conceptions of the nature of mathematics, their models of teaching and learning, and their broader educational and social values interact to shape their classroom practice.

Closely related to this was his influential analysis of the social and political context of the mathematics curriculum. He argued that the school mathematics curriculum is a site of ideological struggle, identifying five distinct social groups whose competing aims and values shape its content and purpose: industrial trainers, concerned with basic skills for the workforce; technological pragmatists, focused on applied problem-solving and relevance; old humanists, who value mathematics as a pure, abstract body of knowledge for cultural transmission; progressive educators, who prioritize child-centered learning and experience; and public educators, who see mathematics as a tool for social justice and critical citizenship. This framework illuminated how conflicts over curriculum reform are rooted in deeper ideological disagreements.

Ernest was instrumental in establishing the philosophy of mathematics education as a distinct field of study. He developed a comprehensive social constructivist philosophy, first in his widely cited 1991 book The Philosophy of Mathematics Education and then in its fully elaborated form in Social Constructivism as a Philosophy of Mathematics (1998). In this work, he offered a critique of absolutist views of mathematics and, building on the ideas of Ludwig Wittgenstein and Imre Lakatos, argued for a conception of mathematical knowledge as a fallible, historically-situated, and socially constructed practice. A key part of this project was his sustained critique of radical constructivism for being overly individualistic, arguing instead for the primacy of social processes in the creation and validation of knowledge.

At the heart of Ernest's social constructivism lies a distinctive epistemological metaphor and 'unit of analysis': conversation. This metaphor positions dialogue, rather than a solitary mind mirroring an objective reality, as the fundamental process through which knowledge is generated, justified, and understood. Ernest argues that conversation operates in three interconnected forms. The primary form is interpersonal conversation, the direct, real-time exchange between persons in shared contexts, encompassing all forms of communication, not merely written text. A second, derived form is intrapersonal conversation, or inner speech. Drawing on the work of Vygotsky and others, Ernest conceptualises thought itself as the internalised conversation one has with oneself, a process whereby the social dynamics of dialogue are turned inward to structure individual reasoning. The third form is extended conversation, which is mediated by representations sent back and forth across distance and time, including letters, emails, academic papers, and books. This form constitutes the "conversation of humankind" and underpins the historical development of cultural knowledge, including mathematics. In each of these three forms, the same two fundamental roles are in operation—roles that all humans experience, learn, and come to inhabit: the proponent, who puts forward a claim, idea, or proposal, and the critic, who reacts to, questions, and evaluates it. Humans, not just mathematicians, must internalise and operate in these two roles, in order to learn and grow. The interplay between these roles, from internal reflection to formal peer review, drives the creation and validation of knowledge, making social constructivism a fundamentally dialogical epistemology. Conversation is the fundamental process underpinning both the teaching and learning of mathematics (formation of mathematical identity and capabilities) and the subjects of the philosophy of mathematics (construction, warranting and maintaining mathematical concepts, objects, results, proofs and theories).

During this phase, he also turned his attention to issues of social justice, exploring gender, values, and the political dimensions of mathematics education. This aligned with the emerging field of critical mathematics education, where he argued that mathematics teaching should empower learners to become critical citizens capable of evaluating the social uses (and abuses) of mathematics.

=== Later phase: Semiotics, ethics, and the philosophy of mathematical practice ===
In his later career, Ernest's work broadened to encompass new theoretical frameworks and topics. He developed a sophisticated analysis of mathematics using semiotics and textual analysis, applying these tools to understand mathematical texts, activity, and learning.

He has also been a leading voice in expanding the philosophy of mathematics education to include ethics and values. His work critically examines the ethical obligations of mathematics teachers, the potential for mathematics to cause harm, and the ideology of purity and neutrality that often surrounds the subject. His 2018 chapter, "The Ethics of Mathematics: Is Mathematics Harmful?", directly challenged the notion of mathematics as a neutral, value-free enterprise, arguing that its applications and its cultural authority can have damaging social and ethical consequences.

This argument sparked controversy, with critics interpreting it as a fundamental attack on the discipline itself. The National Review published a critical response, with a commentator dismissing the claims as "absurd" and asserting that "some things in life are objective and rational, and that's perfectly okay." The article characterized Ernest's argument as suggesting that learning mathematics makes people "emotionless." In response to the public criticism, the Association of Mathematics Teacher Educators (AMTE) issued a press release supporting Ernest and his fellow author Eric Gutstein. The AMTE affirmed that their chapters presented "thoughtful, research-based perspectives" and that "research and inquiry about challenging topics pushes us to consider new perspectives and moves forward learning in the field."

The controversy also galvanized a new area of inquiry, culminating in the major edited collection, Ethics and Mathematics Education: The Good, the Bad and the Ugly (2024). Ernest's contributions in this later phase also include work on the ontology of mathematics, the axiology and aesthetics of mathematics, and critical approaches to the history of concepts like zero and infinity. Throughout this phase, he has continued to develop his social practice philosophy of mathematics.

== The Philosophy of Mathematics Education Journal ==
In 1990, Ernest founded the Philosophy of Mathematics Education Journal (initially a newsletter), which he continues to edit. It was one of the first open-access journals in the field, making philosophically and theoretically oriented work freely available to a global audience. The journal has been hosted at the University of Exeter's website since 1995 and has been instrumental in fostering the international community of scholars working in this area. Issue No. 43 was published in March 2026, marking over 35 years of continuous publication.

== Selected publications ==
=== Books ===
- Ernest, P. (1991). The Philosophy of Mathematics Education. London: Falmer Press. ISBN 978-1-85000-666-4
- Ernest, P. (1998). Social Constructivism as a Philosophy of Mathematics. Albany, NY: SUNY Press. ISBN 978-0-7914-3588-5
- Ernest, P. (Ed.). (2018). The Philosophy of Mathematics Education Today. Cham: Springer. ISBN 9783319777603
- Ernest, P. (Ed.). (2024). Ethics and Mathematics Education: The Good, the Bad and the Ugly. Cham: Springer. ISBN 978-3-031-58683-5

=== Selected journal articles and chapters ===
- Ernest, P. (1989). "The Knowledge, Beliefs and Attitudes of the Mathematics Teacher: A Model." Journal of Education for Teaching, 15(1), 13-33. doi:10.1080/0260747890150102
- Ernest, P. (1989). "The Impact of Beliefs on Teaching". In P. Ernest (Ed.), Mathematics Teaching: The State of the Art (pp. 249–254). London: Falmer Press.
- Ernest, P. (1992). "The Nature of Mathematics: Towards a Social Constructivist Account". Science and Education, 1(1), 89-100. doi:10.1007/BF00430211
- Ernest, P. (1999). "Forms of Knowledge in Mathematics and Mathematics Education: Philosophical and Rhetorical Perspectives". Educational Studies in Mathematics, 38(1-3), 67-83. doi:10.1023/A:1003583910247
- Ernest, P. (2006). "A Semiotic Perspective of Mathematical Activity: The Case of Number". Educational Studies in Mathematics, 61, 67-101. doi:10.1007/s10649-006-6423-7
- Ernest, P. (2016). "The Problem of Certainty in Mathematics". Educational Studies in Mathematics, 92(3), 379-393. doi:10.1007/s10649-015-9651-x
- Ernest, P. (2018). "The Ethics of Mathematics: Is Mathematics Harmful?" In P. Ernest (Ed.), The Philosophy of Mathematics Education Today (pp. 187–216). Cham: Springer. doi:10.1007/978-3-319-77760-9_12
- Ernest, P. (2021). "Mathematics, Ethics and Purism: An Application of MacIntyre's Virtue Theory." Synthese, 199, 3137-3167. doi:10.1007/s11229-020-02928-1
