= Philosophy of mathematics =

Philosophy of mathematics is the branch of philosophy that deals with the nature of mathematics and its relationship to other areas of philosophy, particularly epistemology and metaphysics. Central questions posed include whether or not mathematical objects are purely abstract entities or are in some way concrete, and in what the relationship such objects have with physical reality consists.

Major themes that are dealt with in philosophy of mathematics include:

- Reality: The question is whether mathematics is a pure product of human mind, whether it has some reality by itself, or something else.
- Logic and rigor:
  - Which logical systems are acceptable?
  - Mathematical truth: relationship between truth and provability.
- Mathematical epistemology: How humans come to have knowledge of mathematics.
- Relationship with physical reality: this includes the relationship of abstract mathematical concepts, such as numbers and lines, with the real world, and also the relationship of hese intuitive concepts with their formal definitions, such as Peano axioms and Hilbert's axioms.
- Relationship with science
- Relationship with applications
- Mathematical beauty
- Nature as human activity (science, art, game, or all together)

== Major themes ==
=== Reality ===
The connection between mathematics and material reality has led to philosophical debates since at least the time of Pythagoras. The ancient philosopher Plato argued that abstractions that reflect material reality have themselves a reality that exists outside space and time. As a result, the philosophical view that mathematical objects somehow exist on their own in abstraction is often referred to as Platonism. Independently of their possible philosophical opinions, modern mathematicians may be generally considered as Platonists, since they think of and talk of their objects of study as real objects.

Armand Borel summarized this view of mathematical reality as follows, and provided quotations of G. H. Hardy, Charles Hermite, Henri Poincaré and Albert Einstein that support his views.

Something becomes objective (as opposed to "subjective") as soon as we are convinced that it exists in the minds of others in the same form as it does in ours and that we can think about it and discuss it together. Because the language of mathematics is so precise, it is ideally suited to defining concepts for which such a consensus exists. In my opinion, that is sufficient to provide us with a feeling of an objective existence, of a reality of mathematics ...

Nevertheless, Platonism and the concurrent views on abstraction do not explain the unreasonable effectiveness of mathematics (as Platonism assumes mathematics exists independently, but does not explain why it matches reality).

=== Logic and rigor ===
Mathematical reasoning requires rigor. This means that the definitions must be absolutely unambiguous and the proofs must be reducible to a succession of applications of syllogisms or inference rules, (Note: This does not mean to make explicit all inference rules that are used. On the contrary, this is generally impossible, without computers and proof assistants. Even with this modern technology, it may take years of human work for writing down a completely detailed proof.) without any use of empirical evidence and intuition. (Note: This does not mean that empirical evidence and intuition are not needed for choosing the theorems to be proved and to prove them.)

The rules of rigorous reasoning have been established by the ancient Greek philosophers under the name of logic. Logic is not specific to mathematics, but, in mathematics, the standard of rigor is much higher than elsewhere.

For many centuries, logic, although used for mathematical proofs, belonged to philosophy and was not specifically studied by mathematicians. Circa the end of the 19th century, several paradoxes made questionable the logical foundation of mathematics, and consequently the validity of the whole of mathematics. This has been called the foundational crisis of mathematics. Some of these paradoxes consist of results that seem to contradict the common intuition, such as the possibility to construct valid non-Euclidean geometries in which the parallel postulate is wrong, the Weierstrass function that is continuous but nowhere differentiable, and the study by Georg Cantor of infinite sets, which led to consider several sizes of infinity (infinite cardinals). Even more striking, Russell's paradox shows that the phrase "the set of all sets" is self contradictory.

Several methods have been proposed to solve the problem by changing of logical framework, such as constructive mathematics and intuitionistic logic. Roughly speaking, the first one consists of requiring that every existence theorem must provide an explicit example, and the second one excludes from mathematical reasoning the law of excluded middle and double negation elimination.

These logics have fewer inference rules than classical logic. On the other hand, classical logic was a first-order logic, which means roughly that quantifiers cannot be applied freely to infinite sets. This implies that the set of the real numbers cannot be defined in classical logic, and that the intermediate value theorem cannot be proved. This led to the introduction of higher-order logics, which are presently used commonly in mathematics.

The problems of foundation of mathematics has been eventually resolved with the rise of mathematical logic as a new area of mathematics. In this framework, a mathematical or logical theory consists of a formal language that defines the well-formed assertions, a set of basic assertions called axioms and a set of inference rules that allow producing new assertions from one or several known assertions. A theorem of such a theory is either an axiom or an assertion that can be obtained from previously known theorems by the application of an inference rule. The Zermelo–Fraenkel set theory with the axiom of choice, generally called ZFC, is a higher-order logic in which all mathematics have been restated; it is used implicitly in all mathematics texts that do not specify explicitly on which foundations they are based. Moreover, the other proposed foundations can be modeled and studied inside ZFC.

It results that "rigor" is no more a relevant concept in mathematics, as a proof is either correct or erroneous, and a "rigorous proof" is simply a pleonasm. Where a special concept of rigor comes into play is in the socialized aspects of a proof. In particular, proofs are rarely written in full details, and some steps of a proof are generally considered as trivial, easy, or straightforward, and therefore left to the reader. As most proof errors occur in these skipped steps, a new proof requires to be verified by other specialists of the subject, and can be considered as reliable only after having been accepted by the community of the specialists, which may need several years.

Also, the concept of "rigor" may remain useful for teaching to beginners what is a mathematical proof.

=== Relationship with sciences ===
Mathematics is used in most sciences for modeling phenomena, which then allows predictions to be made from experimental laws. The independence of mathematical truth from any experimentation implies that the accuracy of such predictions depends only on the adequacy of the model. Inaccurate predictions, rather than being caused by invalid mathematical concepts, imply the need to change the mathematical model used. For example, the perihelion precession of Mercury could only be explained after the emergence of Einstein's general relativity, which replaced Newton's law of gravitation as a better mathematical model.

There is still a philosophical debate whether mathematics is a science. However, in practice, mathematicians are typically grouped with scientists, and mathematics shares much in common with the physical sciences. Like them, it is falsifiable, which means in mathematics that if a result or a theory is wrong, this can be proved by providing a counterexample. Similarly as in science, theories and results (theorems) are often obtained from experimentation. In mathematics, the experimentation may consist of computation on selected examples or of the study of figures or other representations of mathematical objects (often mind representations without physical support). For example, when asked how he came about his theorems, Gauss once replied "durch planmässiges Tattonieren" (through systematic experimentation). However, some authors emphasize that mathematics differs from the modern notion of science by not relying on empirical evidence.

==== Unreasonable effectiveness ====
The unreasonable effectiveness of mathematics is a phenomenon that was named and first made explicit by physicist Eugene Wigner. It is the fact that many mathematical theories (even the "purest") have applications outside their initial object. These applications may be completely outside their initial area of mathematics, and may concern physical phenomena that were completely unknown when the mathematical theory was introduced. Examples of unexpected applications of mathematical theories can be found in many areas of mathematics.

A notable example is the prime factorization of natural numbers that was discovered more than 2,000 years before its common use for secure internet communications through the RSA cryptosystem. A second historical example is the theory of ellipses. They were studied by the ancient Greek mathematicians as conic sections (that is, intersections of cones with planes). It was almost 2,000 years later that Johannes Kepler discovered that the trajectories of the planets are ellipses.

In the 19th century, the internal development of geometry (pure mathematics) led to definition and study of non-Euclidean geometries, spaces of dimension higher than three and manifolds. At this time, these concepts seemed totally disconnected from the physical reality, but at the beginning of the 20th century, Albert Einstein developed the theory of relativity that uses fundamentally these concepts. In particular, spacetime of special relativity is a non-Euclidean space of dimension four, and spacetime of general relativity is a (curved) manifold of dimension four.

A striking aspect of the interaction between mathematics and physics is when mathematics drives research in physics. This is illustrated by the discoveries of the positron and the baryon $\Omega^{-}.$ In both cases, the equations of the theories had unexplained solutions, which led to conjecture of the existence of an unknown particle and the search for these particles. In both cases, these particles were discovered a few years later by specific experiments.

== History ==
The origin of mathematics is of arguments and disagreements. Whether the birth of mathematics was by chance or induced by necessity during the development of similar subjects, such as physics, remains an area of contention.

A perennial issue in the philosophy of mathematics concerns the relationship between logic and mathematics at their joint foundations. While 20th-century philosophers continued to ask the questions mentioned at the outset of this article, the philosophy of mathematics in the 20th century was characterized by a predominant interest in formal logic, set theory (both naive set theory and axiomatic set theory), and foundational issues.

It is a profound puzzle that on the one hand mathematical truths seem to have a compelling inevitability, but on the other hand the source of their "truthfulness" remains elusive. Investigations into this issue are known as the foundations of mathematics program.

At the start of the 20th century, philosophers of mathematics were already beginning to divide into various schools of thought about all these questions, broadly distinguished by their pictures of mathematical epistemology and ontology. Three schools, formalism, intuitionism, and logicism, emerged at this time, partly in response to the increasingly widespread worry that mathematics as it stood, and analysis in particular, did not live up to the standards of certainty and rigor that had been taken for granted. Each school addressed the issues that came to the fore at that time, either attempting to resolve them or claiming that mathematics is not entitled to its status as our most trusted knowledge.

Surprising and counter-intuitive developments in formal logic and set theory early in the 20th century led to new questions concerning what was traditionally called the foundations of mathematics. As the century unfolded, the initial focus of concern expanded to an open exploration of the fundamental axioms of mathematics, the axiomatic approach having been taken for granted since the time of Euclid around 300 BCE as the natural basis for mathematics. Notions of axiom, proposition and proof, as well as the notion of a proposition being true of a mathematical object, were formalized, allowing them to be treated mathematically. The Zermelo–Fraenkel axioms for set theory were formulated which provided a conceptual framework in which much mathematical discourse would be interpreted. In mathematics, as in physics, new and unexpected ideas had arisen and significant changes were coming. With Gödel numbering, propositions could be interpreted as referring to themselves or other propositions, enabling inquiry into the consistency of mathematical theories. This reflective critique in which the theory under review "becomes itself the object of a mathematical study" led Hilbert to call such study metamathematics or proof theory.

At the middle of the century, a new mathematical theory was created by Samuel Eilenberg and Saunders Mac Lane, known as category theory, and it became a new contender for the natural language of mathematical thinking. As the 20th century progressed, however, philosophical opinions diverged as to just how well-founded were the questions about foundations that were raised at the century's beginning. Hilary Putnam summed up one common view of the situation in the last third of the century by saying:

When philosophy discovers something wrong with science, sometimes science has to be changed—Russell's paradox comes to mind, as does Berkeley's attack on the actual infinitesimal—but more often it is philosophy that has to be changed. I do not think that the difficulties that philosophy finds with classical mathematics today are genuine difficulties; and I think that the philosophical interpretations of mathematics that we are being offered on every hand are wrong, and that "philosophical interpretation" is just what mathematics doesn't need.

Philosophy of mathematics today proceeds along several different lines of inquiry, by philosophers of mathematics, logicians, and mathematicians, and there are many schools of thought on the subject. The schools are addressed separately in the next section, and their assumptions explained.

== Contemporary schools of thought ==
Contemporary schools of thought in the philosophy of mathematics include: artistic, Platonism, mathematicism, logicism, formalism, conventionalism, intuitionism, constructivism, finitism, structuralism, embodied mind theories (Aristotelian realism, psychologism, empiricism), fictionalism, social constructivism, and non-traditional schools.

However, many of these schools of thought are mutually compatible. For example, most living mathematicians are together Platonists and formalists, give a great importance to aesthetic, and consider that axioms should be chosen for the results they produce, not for their coherence with human intuition of reality (conventionalism).

=== Artistic ===
The artistic perspective sees mathematics as an aesthetic mix of assumptions, making it a form of art. British mathematician G. H. Hardy, in his book A Mathematician's Apology, said that mathematics is best understood as an aesthetic combination of concepts.

=== Platonism ===
Mathematical Platonism is the form of realism that suggests that mathematical entities, such as numbers, are abstract, have no spatiotemporal or causal properties, and are eternal and unchanging.

=== Mathematicism ===
Max Tegmark's mathematical universe hypothesis (or mathematicism) goes further than Platonism in asserting that not only do all mathematical objects exist, but nothing else does. Tegmark's sole postulate is: All structures that exist mathematically also exist physically. That is, in the sense that "in those [worlds] complex enough to contain self-aware substructures [they] will subjectively perceive themselves as existing in a physically 'real' world".

=== Logicism ===
Logicism is the thesis that mathematics is reducible to logic, and hence nothing but a part of logic. Logicists hold that mathematics can be known a priori, but suggest that our knowledge of mathematics is just part of our knowledge of logic in general, and is thus analytic, not requiring any special faculty of mathematical intuition. In this view, logic is the proper foundation of mathematics, and all mathematical statements are necessary logical truths.

Rudolf Carnap (1931) presents the logicist thesis in two parts:

1. The concepts of mathematics can be derived from logical concepts through explicit definitions.
2. The theorems of mathematics can be derived from logical axioms through purely logical deduction.

Gottlob Frege was the founder of logicism. In his seminal Die Grundgesetze der Arithmetik (Basic Laws of Arithmetic) he built up arithmetic from a system of logic with a general principle of comprehension, which he called "Basic Law V" (for concepts F and G, the extension of F equals the extension of G if and only if for all objects a, Fa equals Ga), a principle that he took to be acceptable as part of logic.

Frege's construction was flawed. Bertrand Russell discovered that Basic Law V is inconsistent (this is Russell's paradox). Frege abandoned his logicist program soon after this, but it was continued by Russell and Whitehead. They attributed the paradox to "vicious circularity" and built up what they called ramified type theory to deal with it. In this system, they were eventually able to build up much of modern mathematics but in an altered, and excessively complex form (for example, there were different natural numbers in each type, and there were infinitely many types). They also had to make several compromises in order to develop much of mathematics, such as the "axiom of reducibility". Even Russell said that this axiom did not really belong to logic.

Modern logicists (like Bob Hale, Crispin Wright, and perhaps others) have returned to a program closer to Frege's. They have abandoned Basic Law V in favor of abstraction principles such as Hume's principle (the number of objects falling under the concept F equals the number of objects falling under the concept G if and only if the extension of F and the extension of G can be put into one-to-one correspondence). Frege required Basic Law V to be able to give an explicit definition of the numbers, but all the properties of numbers can be derived from Hume's principle. This would not have been enough for Frege because (to paraphrase him) it does not exclude the possibility that the number 3 is in fact Julius Caesar. In addition, many of the weakened principles that they have had to adopt to replace Basic Law V no longer seem so obviously analytic, and thus purely logical.

=== Formalism ===
Formalism holds that mathematical statements may be thought of as statements about the consequences of certain string manipulation rules. For example, in the "game" of Euclidean geometry (which is seen as consisting of some strings called "axioms", and some "rules of inference" to generate new strings from given ones), one can prove that the Pythagorean theorem holds (that is, one can generate the string corresponding to the Pythagorean theorem). According to formalism, mathematical truths are not about numbers and sets and triangles and the like—in fact, they are not "about" anything at all.

Another version of formalism is known as deductivism. In deductivism, the Pythagorean theorem is not an absolute truth, but a relative one, if it follows deductively from the appropriate axioms. The same is held to be true for all other mathematical statements.

Formalism need not mean that mathematics is nothing more than a meaningless symbolic game. It is usually hoped that there exists some interpretation in which the rules of the game hold. (Compare this position to structuralism.) But it does allow the working mathematician to continue in his or her work and leave such problems to the philosopher or scientist. Many formalists would say that in practice, the axiom systems to be studied will be suggested by the demands of science or other areas of mathematics.

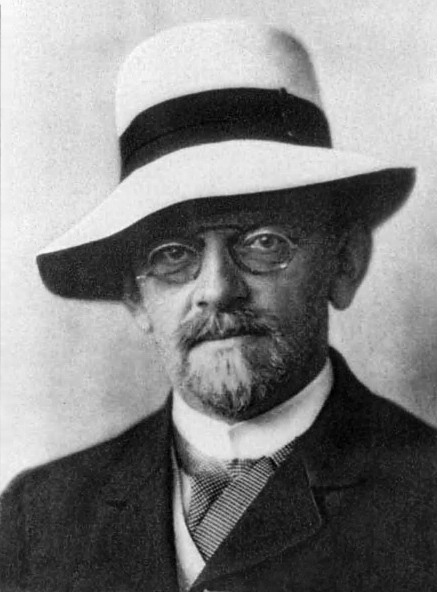
David Hilbert

A major early proponent of formalism was David Hilbert, whose program was intended to be a complete and consistent axiomatization of all of mathematics. Hilbert aimed to show the consistency of mathematical systems from the assumption that the "finitary arithmetic" (a subsystem of the usual arithmetic of the positive integers, chosen to be philosophically uncontroversial) was consistent. Hilbert's goals of creating a system of mathematics that is both complete and consistent were seriously undermined by the second of Gödel's incompleteness theorems, which states that sufficiently expressive consistent axiom systems can never prove their own consistency. Since any such axiom system would contain the finitary arithmetic as a subsystem, Gödel's theorem implied that it would be impossible to prove the system's consistency relative to that (since it would then prove its own consistency, which Gödel had shown was impossible). Thus, in order to show that any axiomatic system of mathematics is in fact consistent, one needs to first assume the consistency of a system of mathematics that is in a sense stronger than the system to be proven consistent.

Hilbert was initially a deductivist, but, as may be clear from above, he considered certain metamathematical methods to yield intrinsically meaningful results and was a realist with respect to the finitary arithmetic. Later, he held the opinion that there was no other meaningful mathematics whatsoever, regardless of interpretation.

Other formalists, such as Rudolf Carnap, Alfred Tarski, and Haskell Curry, considered mathematics to be the investigation of formal axiom systems. Mathematical logicians study formal systems but are just as often realists as they are formalists.

Formalists are relatively tolerant and inviting to new approaches to logic, non-standard number systems, new set theories, etc. The more games we study, the better. However, in all three of these examples, motivation is drawn from existing mathematical or philosophical concerns. The "games" are usually not arbitrary.

The main critique of formalism is that the actual mathematical ideas that occupy mathematicians are far removed from the string manipulation games mentioned above. Formalism is thus silent on the question of which axiom systems ought to be studied, as none is more meaningful than another from a formalistic point of view.

Recently, some formalist mathematicians have proposed that all of our formal mathematical knowledge should be systematically encoded in computer-readable formats, so as to facilitate automated proof checking of mathematical proofs and the use of interactive theorem proving in the development of mathematical theories and computer software. Because of their close connection with computer science, this idea is also advocated by mathematical intuitionists and constructivists in the "computability" tradition—.

=== Conventionalism ===
The French mathematician Henri Poincaré was among the first to articulate a conventionalist view. Poincaré's use of non-Euclidean geometries in his work on differential equations convinced him that Euclidean geometry should not be regarded as a priori truth. He held that axioms in geometry should be chosen for the results they produce, not for their apparent coherence with human intuitions about the physical world.

=== Intuitionism ===
In mathematics, intuitionism is a program of methodological reform whose motto is that "there are no non-experienced mathematical truths" (L. E. J. Brouwer). From this springboard, intuitionists seek to reconstruct what they consider to be the corrigible portion of mathematics in accordance with Kantian concepts of being, becoming, intuition, and knowledge. Brouwer, the founder of the movement, held that mathematical objects arise from the a priori forms of the volitions that inform the perception of empirical objects.

A major force behind intuitionism was L. E. J. Brouwer, who rejected the usefulness of formalized logic of any sort for mathematics. His student Arend Heyting postulated an intuitionistic logic, different from the classical Aristotelian logic; this logic does not contain the law of the excluded middle and therefore frowns upon proofs by contradiction. The axiom of choice is also rejected in most intuitionistic set theories, though in some versions it is accepted.

In intuitionism, the term "explicit construction" is not cleanly defined, and that has led to criticisms. Attempts have been made to use the concepts of Turing machine or computable function to fill this gap, leading to the claim that only questions regarding the behavior of finite algorithms are meaningful and should be investigated in mathematics. This has led to the study of the computable numbers, first introduced by Alan Turing. Not surprisingly, then, this approach to mathematics is sometimes associated with theoretical computer science.

==== Constructivism ====
Like intuitionism, constructivism involves the regulative principle that only mathematical entities which can be explicitly constructed in a certain sense should be admitted to mathematical discourse. In this view, mathematics is an exercise of the human intuition, not a game played with meaningless symbols. Instead, it is about entities that we can create directly through mental activity. In addition, some adherents of these schools reject non-constructive proofs, such as using proof by contradiction when showing the existence of an object or when trying to establish the truth of some proposition. Important work was done by Errett Bishop, who managed to prove versions of the most important theorems in real analysis as constructive analysis in his 1967 Foundations of Constructive Analysis.

==== Finitism ====
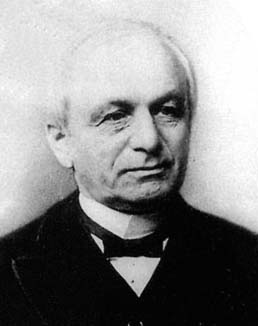
Leopold Kronecker

Finitism is an extreme form of constructivism, according to which a mathematical object does not exist unless it can be constructed from natural numbers in a finite number of steps. In her book Philosophy of Set Theory, Mary Tiles characterized those who allow countably infinite objects as classical finitists, and those who deny even countably infinite objects as strict finitists.

The most famous proponent of finitism was Leopold Kronecker, who said:

God created the natural numbers, all else is the work of man.

Ultrafinitism is an even more extreme version of finitism, which rejects not only infinities but finite quantities that cannot feasibly be constructed with available resources. Another variant of finitism is Euclidean arithmetic, a system developed by John Penn Mayberry in his book The Foundations of Mathematics in the Theory of Sets. Mayberry's system is Aristotelian in general inspiration and, despite his strong rejection of any role for operationalism or feasibility in the foundations of mathematics, comes to somewhat similar conclusions, such as, for instance, that super-exponentiation is not a legitimate finitary function.

=== Structuralism ===
Structuralism is a position holding that mathematical theories describe structures, and that mathematical objects are exhaustively defined by their places in such structures, consequently having no intrinsic properties. For instance, it would maintain that all that needs to be known about the number 1 is that it is the first whole number after 0. Likewise all the other whole numbers are defined by their places in a structure, the number line. Other examples of mathematical objects might include lines and planes in geometry, or elements and operations in abstract algebra.

Structuralism is an epistemologically realistic view in that it holds that mathematical statements have an objective truth value. However, its central claim only relates to what kind of entity a mathematical object is, not to what kind of existence mathematical objects or structures have (not, in other words, to their ontology). The kind of existence mathematical objects have would clearly be dependent on that of the structures in which they are embedded; different sub-varieties of structuralism make different ontological claims in this regard.

The ante rem structuralism ("before the thing") has a similar ontology to Platonism. Structures are held to have a real but abstract and immaterial existence. As such, it faces the standard epistemological problem of explaining the interaction between such abstract structures and flesh-and-blood mathematicians.

The in re structuralism ("in the thing") is the equivalent of Aristotelian realism. Structures are held to exist inasmuch as some concrete system exemplifies them. This incurs the usual issues that some perfectly legitimate structures might accidentally happen not to exist, and that a finite physical world might not be "big" enough to accommodate some otherwise legitimate structures.

The post rem structuralism ("after the thing") is anti-realist about structures in a way that parallels nominalism. Like nominalism, the post rem approach denies the existence of abstract mathematical objects with properties other than their place in a relational structure. According to this view mathematical systems exist, and have structural features in common. If something is true of a structure, it will be true of all systems exemplifying the structure. However, it is merely instrumental to talk of structures being "held in common" between systems: they in fact have no independent existence.

=== Embodied mind theories ===
Embodied mind theories hold that mathematical thought is a natural outgrowth of the human cognitive apparatus which finds itself in our physical universe. For example, the abstract concept of number springs from the experience of counting discrete objects (requiring the human senses such as sight for detecting the objects, touch; and signalling from the brain). It is held that mathematics is not universal and does not exist in any real sense, other than in human brains. Humans construct, but do not discover, mathematics.

The cognitive processes of pattern-finding and distinguishing objects are also subject to neuroscience; if mathematics is considered to be relevant to a natural world (such as from realism or a degree of it, as opposed to pure solipsism).

Its actual relevance to reality, while accepted to be a trustworthy approximation (it is also suggested the evolution of perceptions, the body, and the senses may have been necessary for survival) is not necessarily accurate to a full realism (and is still subject to flaws such as illusion, assumptions (consequently; the foundations and axioms in which mathematics have been formed by humans), generalisations, deception, and hallucinations). As such, this may also raise questions for the modern scientific method for its compatibility with general mathematics; as while relatively reliable, it is still limited by what can be measured by empiricism which may not be as reliable as previously assumed (see also: 'counterintuitive' concepts in such as quantum nonlocality, and action at a distance).

Another issue is that one numeral system may not necessarily be applicable to problem solving. Subjects such as complex numbers or imaginary numbers require specific changes to more commonly used axioms of mathematics; otherwise they cannot be adequately understood.

Alternatively, computer programmers may use hexadecimal for its 'human-friendly' representation of binary-coded values, rather than decimal (convenient for counting because humans have ten fingers). The axioms or logical rules behind mathematics also vary through time (such as the invention and adaptation of zero).

As perceptions from the human brain are subject to illusions, assumptions, deceptions, (induced) hallucinations, cognitive errors or assumptions in a general context, it can be questioned whether they are accurate or strictly indicative of truth (see also: philosophy of being), and the nature of empiricism itself in relation to the universe and whether it is independent to the senses and the universe.

The human mind has no special claim on reality or approaches to it built out of math. If such constructs as Euler's identity are true then they are true as a map of the human mind and cognition.

Embodied mind theorists thus explain the effectiveness of mathematics—mathematics was constructed by the brain in order to be effective in this universe.

The most accessible, famous, and infamous treatment of this perspective is Where Mathematics Comes From, by George Lakoff and Rafael E. Núñez. In addition, mathematician Keith Devlin has investigated similar concepts with his book The Math Instinct, as has neuroscientist Stanislas Dehaene with his book The Number Sense.

==== Aristotelian realism ====
Aristotelian realism holds that mathematics studies properties such as symmetry, continuity and order that can be literally realized in the physical world (or in any other world there might be). It contrasts with Platonism in holding that the objects of mathematics, such as numbers, do not exist in an "abstract" world but can be physically realized. For example, the number 4 is realized in the relation between a heap of parrots and the universal "being a parrot" that divides the heap into so many parrots. Aristotelian realism is defended by James Franklin and the Sydney School in the philosophy of mathematics and is close to the view of Penelope Maddy that when an egg carton is opened, a set of three eggs is perceived (that is, a mathematical entity realized in the physical world). A problem for Aristotelian realism is what account to give of higher infinities, which may not be realizable in the physical world.

The Euclidean arithmetic developed by John Penn Mayberry in his book The Foundations of Mathematics in the Theory of Sets also falls into the Aristotelian realist tradition. Mayberry, following Euclid, considers numbers to be simply "definite multitudes of units" realized in nature—such as "the members of the London Symphony Orchestra" or "the trees in Birnam wood". Whether or not there are definite multitudes of units for which Euclid's Common Notion 5 (the whole is greater than the part) fails and which would consequently be reckoned as infinite is for Mayberry essentially a question about Nature and does not entail any transcendental suppositions.

==== Psychologism ====
Psychologism in the philosophy of mathematics is the position that mathematical concepts and/or truths are grounded in, derived from or explained by psychological facts (or laws).

John Stuart Mill seems to have been an advocate of a type of logical psychologism, as were many 19th-century German logicians such as Sigwart and Erdmann as well as a number of psychologists, past and present: for example, Gustave Le Bon. Psychologism was famously criticized by Frege in his The Foundations of Arithmetic, and many of his works and essays, including his review of Husserl's Philosophy of Arithmetic. Edmund Husserl, in the first volume of his Logical Investigations, called "The Prolegomena of Pure Logic", criticized psychologism thoroughly and sought to distance himself from it. The "Prolegomena" is considered a more concise, fair, and thorough refutation of psychologism than the criticisms made by Frege, and also it is considered today by many as being a memorable refutation for its decisive blow to psychologism. Psychologism was also criticized by Charles Sanders Peirce and Maurice Merleau-Ponty.

==== Empiricism ====
Mathematical empiricism is a form of realism that denies that mathematics can be known a priori at all. It says that we discover mathematical facts by empirical research, just like facts in any of the other sciences. It is not one of the classical three positions advocated in the early 20th century, but primarily arose in the middle of the century. However, an important early proponent of a view like this was John Stuart Mill. Mill's view was widely criticized, because, according to critics, such as A.J. Ayer, it makes statements like "2 + 2 = 4" come out as uncertain, contingent truths, which we can only learn by observing instances of two pairs coming together and forming a quartet.

Karl Popper was another philosopher to point out empirical aspects of mathematics, observing that "most mathematical theories are, like those of physics and biology, hypothetico-deductive: pure mathematics therefore turns out to be much closer to the natural sciences whose hypotheses are conjectures, than it seemed even recently." Popper also noted he would "admit a system as empirical or scientific only if it is capable of being tested by experience."

Contemporary mathematical empiricism, formulated by W. V. O. Quine and Hilary Putnam, is primarily supported by the indispensability argument: mathematics is indispensable to all empirical sciences, and if we want to believe in the reality of the phenomena described by the sciences, we ought also believe in the reality of those entities required for this description. That is, since physics needs to talk about electrons to say why light bulbs behave as they do, then electrons must exist. Since physics needs to talk about numbers in offering any of its explanations, then numbers must exist. In keeping with Quine and Putnam's overall philosophies, this is a naturalistic argument. It argues for the existence of mathematical entities as the best explanation for experience, thus stripping mathematics of being distinct from the other sciences.

Putnam strongly rejected the term "Platonist" as implying an over-specific ontology that was not necessary to mathematical practice in any real sense. He advocated a form of "pure realism" that rejected mystical notions of truth and accepted much quasi-empiricism in mathematics. This grew from the increasingly popular assertion in the late 20th century that no one foundation of mathematics could be ever proven to exist. It is also sometimes called "postmodernism in mathematics" although that term is considered overloaded by some and insulting by others. Quasi-empiricism argues that in doing their research, mathematicians test hypotheses as well as prove theorems. A mathematical argument can transmit falsity from the conclusion to the premises just as well as it can transmit truth from the premises to the conclusion. Putnam has argued that any theory of mathematical realism would include quasi-empirical methods. He proposed that an alien species doing mathematics might well rely on quasi-empirical methods primarily, being willing often to forgo rigorous and axiomatic proofs, and still be doing mathematics—at perhaps a somewhat greater risk of failure of their calculations. He gave a detailed argument for this in New Directions. Quasi-empiricism was also developed by Imre Lakatos.

The most important criticism of empirical views of mathematics is approximately the same as that raised against Mill. If mathematics is just as empirical as the other sciences, then this suggests that its results are just as fallible as theirs, and just as contingent. In Mill's case the empirical justification comes directly, while in Quine's case it comes indirectly, through the coherence of our scientific theory as a whole, i.e. consilience after E.O. Wilson. Quine suggests that mathematics seems completely certain because the role it plays in our web of belief is extraordinarily central, and that it would be extremely difficult for us to revise it, though not impossible.

For a philosophy of mathematics that attempts to overcome some of the shortcomings of Quine and Gödel's approaches by taking aspects of each see Penelope Maddy's Realism in Mathematics. Another example of a realist theory is the embodied mind theory.

=== Fictionalism ===
Mathematical fictionalism was brought to fame in 1980 when Hartry Field published Science Without Numbers, which rejected and in fact reversed Quine's indispensability argument. Where Quine suggested that mathematics was indispensable for our best scientific theories, and therefore should be accepted as a body of truths talking about independently existing entities, Field suggested that mathematics was dispensable, and therefore should be considered as a body of falsehoods not talking about anything real. He did this by giving a complete axiomatization of Newtonian mechanics with no reference to numbers or functions at all. He started with the "betweenness" of Hilbert's axioms to characterize space without coordinatizing it, and then added extra relations between points to do the work formerly done by vector fields. Hilbert's geometry is mathematical, because it talks about abstract points, but in Field's theory, these points are the concrete points of physical space, so no special mathematical objects at all are needed.

Having shown how to do science without using numbers, Field proceeded to rehabilitate mathematics as a kind of useful fiction. He showed that mathematical physics is a conservative extension of his non-mathematical physics (that is, every physical fact provable in mathematical physics is already provable from Field's system), so that mathematics is a reliable process whose physical applications are all true, even though its own statements are false. Thus, when doing mathematics, we can see ourselves as telling a sort of story, talking as if numbers existed. For Field, a statement like "2 + 2 = 4" is just as fictitious as "Sherlock Holmes lived at 221B Baker Street"—but both are true according to the relevant fictions.

Another fictionalist, Mary Leng, expresses the perspective succinctly by dismissing any seeming connection between mathematics and the physical world as "a happy coincidence". This rejection separates fictionalism from other forms of anti-realism, which see mathematics itself as artificial but still bounded or fitted to reality in some way.

By this account, there are no metaphysical or epistemological problems special to mathematics. The only worries left are the general worries about non-mathematical physics, and about fiction in general. Field's approach has been very influential, but is widely rejected. This is in part because of the requirement of strong fragments of second-order logic to carry out his reduction, and because the statement of conservativity seems to require quantification over abstract models or deductions.

=== Social constructivism ===
Social constructivism sees mathematics primarily as a social construct, as a product of culture, subject to correction and change. Like the other sciences, mathematics is viewed as an empirical endeavor whose results are constantly evaluated and may be discarded. However, while on an empiricist view the evaluation is some sort of comparison with "reality", social constructivists emphasize that the direction of mathematical research is dictated by the fashions of the social group performing it or by the needs of the society financing it. However, although such external forces may change the direction of some mathematical research, there are strong internal constraints—the mathematical traditions, methods, problems, meanings and values into which mathematicians are enculturated—that work to conserve the historically defined discipline.

This runs counter to the traditional beliefs of working mathematicians, that mathematics is somehow pure or objective. But social constructivists argue that mathematics is in fact grounded by much uncertainty: as mathematical practice evolves, the status of previous mathematics is cast into doubt, and is corrected to the degree it is required or desired by the current mathematical community. This can be seen in the development of analysis from reexamination of the calculus of Leibniz and Newton. They argue further that finished mathematics is often accorded too much status, and folk mathematics not enough, due to an overemphasis on axiomatic proof and peer review as practices.

The social nature of mathematics is highlighted in its subcultures. Major discoveries can be made in one branch of mathematics and be relevant to another, yet the relationship goes undiscovered for lack of social contact between mathematicians. Social constructivists argue each speciality forms its own epistemic community and often has great difficulty communicating, or motivating the investigation of unifying conjectures that might relate different areas of mathematics. Social constructivists see the process of "doing mathematics" as actually creating the meaning, while social realists see a deficiency either of human capacity to abstractify, or of human's cognitive bias, or of mathematicians' collective intelligence as preventing the comprehension of a real universe of mathematical objects. Social constructivists sometimes reject the search for foundations of mathematics as bound to fail, as pointless or even meaningless.

Contributions to this school have been made by Imre Lakatos and Thomas Tymoczko, although it is not clear that either would endorse the title. More recently Paul Ernest has explicitly formulated a social constructivist philosophy of mathematics. Some consider the work of Paul Erdős as a whole to have advanced this view (although he personally rejected it) because of his uniquely broad collaborations, which prompted others to see and study "mathematics as a social activity", e.g., via the Erdős number. Reuben Hersh has also promoted the social view of mathematics, calling it a "humanistic" approach, similar to but not quite the same as that associated with Alvin White; one of Hersh's co-authors, Philip J. Davis, has expressed sympathy for the social view as well.

=== Beyond the traditional schools ===
==== Unreasonable effectiveness ====
Rather than focus on narrow debates about the true nature of mathematical truth, or even on practices unique to mathematicians such as the proof, a growing movement from the 1960s to the 1990s began to question the idea of seeking foundations or finding any one right answer to why mathematics works. The starting point for this was Eugene Wigner's famous 1960 paper "The Unreasonable Effectiveness of Mathematics in the Natural Sciences", in which he argued that the happy coincidence of mathematics and physics being so well matched seemed to be unreasonable and hard to explain.

==== Popper's two senses of number statements ====
Realist and constructivist theories are normally taken to be contraries. However, Karl Popper argued that a number statement such as "2 apples + 2 apples = 4 apples" can be taken in two senses. In one sense it is irrefutable and logically true. In the second sense it is factually true and falsifiable. Another way of putting this is to say that a single number statement can express two propositions: one of which can be explained on constructivist lines; the other on realist lines.

==== Philosophy of language ====
Mohan Ganesalingam has analysed mathematical language using tools from formal linguistics. Ganesalingam notes that some features of natural language are not necessary when analysing mathematical language (such as tense), but many of the same analytical tools can be used (such as context-free grammars). One important difference is that mathematical objects have clearly defined types, which can be explicitly defined in a text: "Effectively, we are allowed to introduce a word in one part of a sentence, and declare its part of speech in another; and this operation has no analogue in natural language."

== Arguments ==
=== Indispensability argument for realism ===
This argument, associated with Willard Quine and Hilary Putnam, is considered by Stephen Yablo to be one of the most challenging arguments in favor of the acceptance of the existence of abstract mathematical entities, such as numbers and sets. The form of the argument is as follows.

1. One must have ontological commitments to all entities that are indispensable to the best scientific theories, and to those entities only (commonly referred to as "all and only").
2. Mathematical entities are indispensable to the best scientific theories. Therefore,
3. One must have ontological commitments to mathematical entities.

The justification for the first premise is the most controversial. Both Putnam and Quine invoke naturalism to justify the exclusion of all non-scientific entities, and hence to defend the "only" part of "all and only". The assertion that "all" entities postulated in scientific theories, including numbers, should be accepted as real is justified by confirmation holism. Since theories are not confirmed in a piecemeal fashion, but as a whole, there is no justification for excluding any of the entities referred to in well-confirmed theories. This puts the nominalist who wishes to exclude the existence of sets and non-Euclidean geometry, but to include the existence of quarks and other undetectable entities of physics, for example, in a difficult position.

=== Epistemic argument against realism ===
The anti-realist "epistemic argument" against Platonism has been made by Paul Benacerraf and Hartry Field. Platonism posits that mathematical objects are abstract entities. By general agreement, abstract entities cannot interact causally with concrete, physical entities ("the truth-values of our mathematical assertions depend on facts involving Platonic entities that reside in a realm outside of space-time"). Whilst our knowledge of concrete, physical objects is based on our ability to perceive them, and therefore to causally interact with them, there is no parallel account of how mathematicians come to have knowledge of abstract objects. Another way of making the point is that if the Platonic world were to disappear, it would make no difference to the ability of mathematicians to generate proofs, etc., which is already fully accountable in terms of physical processes in their brains.

Field developed his views into fictionalism. Benacerraf also developed the philosophy of mathematical structuralism, according to which there are no mathematical objects. Nonetheless, some versions of structuralism are compatible with some versions of realism.

The argument hinges on the idea that a satisfactory naturalistic account of thought processes in terms of brain processes can be given for mathematical reasoning along with everything else. One line of defense is to maintain that this is false, so that mathematical reasoning uses some special intuition that involves contact with the Platonic realm. A modern form of this argument is given by Sir Roger Penrose.

Another line of defense is to maintain that abstract objects are relevant to mathematical reasoning in a way that is non-causal, and not analogous to perception. This argument is developed by Jerrold Katz in his 2000 book Realistic Rationalism.

A more radical defense is denial of physical reality, i.e. the mathematical universe hypothesis. In that case, a mathematician's knowledge of mathematics is one mathematical object making contact with another.

== Aesthetics ==
Many practicing mathematicians have been drawn to their subject because of a sense of beauty they perceive in it. One sometimes hears the sentiment that mathematicians would like to leave philosophy to the philosophers and get back to mathematics—where, presumably, the beauty lies.

In his work on the divine proportion, H.E. Huntley relates the feeling of reading and understanding someone else's proof of a theorem of mathematics to that of a viewer of a masterpiece of art—the reader of a proof has a similar sense of exhilaration at understanding as the original author of the proof, much as, he argues, the viewer of a masterpiece has a sense of exhilaration similar to the original painter or sculptor. Indeed, one can study mathematical and scientific writings as literature.

Philip J. Davis and Reuben Hersh have commented that the sense of mathematical beauty is universal amongst practicing mathematicians. By way of example, they provide two proofs of the irrationality of √2. The first is the traditional proof by contradiction, ascribed to Euclid; the second is a more direct proof involving the fundamental theorem of arithmetic that, they argue, gets to the heart of the issue. Davis and Hersh argue that mathematicians find the second proof more aesthetically appealing because it gets closer to the nature of the problem.

Paul Erdős was well known for his notion of a hypothetical "Book" containing the most elegant or beautiful mathematical proofs. There is not universal agreement that a result has one "most elegant" proof; Gregory Chaitin has argued against this idea.

Philosophers have sometimes criticized mathematicians' sense of beauty or elegance as being, at best, vaguely stated. By the same token, however, philosophers of mathematics have sought to characterize what makes one proof more desirable than another when both are logically sound.

Another aspect of aesthetics concerning mathematics is mathematicians' views towards the possible uses of mathematics for purposes deemed unethical or inappropriate. The best-known exposition of this view occurs in G. H. Hardy's book A Mathematician's Apology, in which Hardy argues that pure mathematics is superior in beauty to applied mathematics precisely because it cannot be used for war and similar ends.

== See also ==
- Definitions of mathematics
- Formal language
- Foundations of mathematics
- Golden ratio
- Model theory
- Nonstandard analysis
- Philosophy of language
- Philosophy of logic
- Philosophy of science
- Philosophy of physics
- Philosophy of probability
- Rule of inference
- Science studies
- Scientific method

=== Related works ===
- The Analyst
- Euclid's Elements
- "On Formally Undecidable Propositions of Principia Mathematica and Related Systems"
- "On Computable Numbers, with an Application to the Entscheidungsproblem"
- Introduction to Mathematical Philosophy
- "New Foundations for Mathematical Logic"
- Principia Mathematica
- The Simplest Mathematics

=== Historical topics ===
- History and philosophy of science
- History of mathematics
- History of philosophy

=== Journals ===
- Philosophia Mathematica
- Journal for the Philosophy of Mathematics
- Philosophy of Mathematics Education Journal
