= Philosophy of Mathematics Education Journal =

- Discipline: Mathematics education
- Language: English
- Edited by: Paul Ernest

Publication details
- History: 1990–present
- Publisher: Paul Ernest (United Kingdom)
- Open access: yes

Standard abbreviations
- ISO 4: Philos. Math. Educ. J.

Indexing
- ISSN: 1465-2978

Links
- Journal homepage

The Philosophy of Mathematics Education Journal is a peer-reviewed open-access academic journal published and edited by Paul Ernest (University of Exeter). It publishes articles relevant to the philosophy of mathematics education, a subfield of mathematics education that often draws in issues from the philosophy of mathematics. The journal includes articles by internationally recognized and beginning researchers, graduate student assignments, theses, and other pertinent resources.

The journal aims to foster awareness of philosophical aspects of mathematics education and mathematics, understood broadly to include most kinds of theoretical reflection and research; to freely disseminate new thinking and to encourage informal communication, dialogue and international co-operation between teachers, scholars and researchers in mathematics, philosophy and education.

Recent authors have included: Brian Greer, David W. Jardine, David W. Stinson, Christopher H. Dubbs, Kathleen Nolan, Margaret Walshaw, Nicolas Balacheff, Ole Skovsmose, Paul Ernest, Tony Brown, Roberto Baldino and Tânia Cabral, Roy Wagner, Sal Restivo, Steven Khan, Ubiratan D'Ambrosio, Yasmine Abtahi.

Special issues of the journal have focussed on

- Self-Based Methodology (issue no. 40, 2023)
- Dedicated to Ubi D'Ambrosio (issue no. 37, 2021)
- Mathematics Education and the Living World: Responses to Ecological Crisis (issue no. 32, 2017)
- Critical Mathematics Education (issue no. 25, Oct. 2010)
- Mathematics and Art (issue no. 29, Sept, 2009)
- Social justice issues in mathematics education, part 2 (issue no. 21, 2007)
- Social justice issues in mathematics education, part 1 (issue no. 20, 2007)
- Semiotics of mathematics education (issue no. 10, 1997)

== See also ==
- List of scientific journals in mathematics education
