= John Penn Mayberry =

John Penn Mayberry (18 November 1939 – 19 August 2016) was an American mathematical philosopher and creator of a distinctive Aristotelian philosophy of mathematics to which he gave expression in his book The Foundations of Mathematics in the Theory of Sets. Following completion of a Ph.D. at Illinois under the supervision of Gaisi Takeuti, he took up, in 1966, a position in the mathematics department of the University of Bristol. He remained there until his retirement in 2004 as a Reader in Mathematics.

== Philosophical work ==
Mayberry's philosophy rejects the Platonic tradition, which holds mathematics to be a transcendental science concerned with discovering truths about immaterial, but intelligible, objective entities, as metaphysically conceited. This stance sets him apart from what probably is the "silent majority" view among practising mathematicians. Roger Penrose eloquently expresses a typical Platonic position.

"The natural numbers were there before there were human beings or indeed any other creatures here in earth, and they will remain after all life has perished. It has always been the case that each natural number is the sum of four squares and it did not have to wait for Lagrange to conjure this fact into existence."

On the other hand, Mayberry also vehemently rejects any understanding of mathematics tainted, as he would think of it, by operationalism. He writes:

"I take operationalism in mathematics to be the doctrine that the foundations of mathematics are to be discovered in the activities (actual or idealised) of mathematicians when they count, calculate, write down proofs, invent symbols, draw diagrams and so on. …… Considerations of human activities and capacities, actual or idealised, have no place in the foundations of mathematics, and we must make every effort to exclude them from the elements, principles and methods on which we intend to base our mathematics."

The most archetypal and most universally promulgated of such operationalist doctrines is that the natural numbers can be constructed beginning with 1, adding 1 to get 2, adding 1 again to get 3 and continuing indefinitely. This is expressed by the notation N = 1, 2, 3 ..., where the dots denote the indefinite replication of "adding 1". In accepting these dots of ellipsis, one accepts the intelligibility of indefinite iteration. Mayberry does not believe that a definition of this type is sufficiently clear and sufficiently disentangled from naïve and possibly misguided intuitions about the nature of time as to warrant its inclusion in mathematics without further justification. He writes:

"When the natural number system is taken as the primary datum, something simply "given", it is natural to see the principles of proof by mathematical induction and definition by recursion along that system as "given" as well. ... The natural numbers are thus seen as what we arrive at in the process of counting out: 1, 2, ..., where the dots of ellipsis "..." are seen as somehow self-explanatory – after all, we know how to continue the count, no matter how far we have taken it. But these dots of ellipsis contain the whole mystery of the notion of natural number! ... Nor are the operations of counting out or calculating to be taken as primary data: they must be analysed in terms of more fundamental notions. We are thus led to reject the operationalism that all the anti-Cantorian schools share.
For us moderns, numbers take their being from what we can do with them, namely count and calculate: but Greek "numbers" (arithmoi) were objects in their own right with simple intelligible natures. Our natural numbers are things we can (in principle) construct (by counting out to them): Greek numbers were simply "there", so to speak. .......
I am convinced that this operationalist conception of natural number is the central fallacy that underlies all our thinking about the foundations of mathematics. It is not confined to heretics but is shared by the orthodox Cantorian majority."

=== Views on Euclid ===
His stance puts him at odds not just with pedagogic practice over the last few centuries but also with a tradition going back to antiquity. In Definition 4 of Book V of his Elements, Euclid defines two magnitudes of the same type, A and B, to "have a ratio to one another" as follows:

"Magnitudes are said to have a ratio to one another which are capable when multiplied of exceeding one another"

In other words, if the repeated addition of one of them, say A, to itself results in a magnitude that exceeds the other, say B, i.e. for some natural number n, nA > B. Conversely A and B are do not have a ratio to one another if the indefinitely repeated addition of one of them to itself never produces a magnitude exceeding the other. In Book V Euclid develops a general theory of ratios and in Book VI demonstrates the power of the ratio concept both greatly to simplify derivations given in Books I – IV and to extend the scope of some of the theorems of Books I – IV. Particularly notable examples are Book III Prop. 35, where a much simpler proof using similar triangles is immediately available, and Book VI Prop. 31 where he extends Pythagoras’ theorem from squares to general similar figures.

In Book VII Euclid introduces, as another type of magnitude alongside his geometric ones of line, angle and figure, the concept of "arithmos". This is to be understood as "a multitude of units" where a unit is "that by which we call something a one". With some reservations about the status of singletons and the empty set, the Greek notion of "arithmos" is thus essentially the modern notion of "set". Mayberry notes that it struck him with the force of a revelation that the significance of Euclid's Common Notion 5,—"the whole is greater than the part"—when applied to arithmoi is that an arithmos cannot be congruent, where this word is understood following Heath as "can be placed upon with an exact fit", to any proper part of itself, or, in other words, that a set is finite in the modern sense of there being no 1-1 correspondence between the set and a proper subset of itself. The fact that Greek arithmetic, and in particular Euclid Books VII-IX, is really the study of finite sets has been obscured by the ubiquitous translation of "arithmos" as "number" and the transformation in the notion of number from its original "arithmos" meaning to "ratio" that occurred in the 17th century. The transformation in meaning was given clear expression by Newton in his Lectures.

"By number I mean not so much a multitude of unities as the abstracted Ratio of any Quantity to another Quantity of the same kind which we take for Unity."

=== Dedekind ===
Mayberry's convictions as to the true historical sequence of events in the development of key mathematical concepts are central to his philosophical orientation. He was led to these by his reading of Jacob Klein's "Greek Mathematical Thought and the Origin of Algebra". and Richard Dedekind's memoir "Was sind und was sollen die Zahlen".

From the middle of the 17th to the 19th century the natural numbers and the notion of unlimited iteration on which they rely acquired foundational status in mathematics, both pragmatically and philosophically. On the philosophical side, Kant classified arithmetic propositions as synthetic a priori knowledge and, in parallel with a similar analysis of geometric theorems which he traced to our intuition of space, traced their compelling nature to our intuition of time. Kant's general position with regard to Arithmetic received the endorsement of the greatest practising mathematicians of the 19th century. Even Gauss, though in dissent from Kant's position on the status of geometry, endorsed his position on Arithmetic.

"I am coming ever more to the conviction that the necessity of our geometry cannot be proved, at least not by human comprehension for human comprehension. Perhaps in another life we will come to other views on the nature of space which are currently obtainable for us. Until then one must not put Geometry in the same rank as Arithmetic, which stands a priori, but rather in the same rank as, say, Mechanics."

Almost a century later Poincaré writes:

"In this domain of Arithmetic we may think ourselves very far from the infinitesimal analysis, but the idea of mathematical infinity is already playing a preponderating role, and without it there would be no science at all, because there would be nothing general. …… We cannot therefore escape the conclusion that the rule of reasoning by recurrence is irreducible to the principle of r contradiction ... This rule, inaccessible to analytical proof and to experiment, is the exact type of the à priori synthetic intuition."

Of the significant figures in the 19th century, only Dedekind appears to have stood against the Kantian consensus. In Was sind und was sollen die Zahlen, he coolly writes:

"In speaking of arithmetic, (algebra, analysis) as a part of logic, I mean to imply that I consider the number concept entirely independent of the notions or intuitions of space and time."

Dedekind, whom Mayberry greatly admired, showed that the natural numbers could be established without any dependence on a Kantian intuition of time or reliance on indefinitely repeated operations. He did so however on the basis of an explicit acceptance of Cantor's Axiom of Infinity, which, as Mayberry points out, is best understood as simply a contradiction of Euclid's Common Notion 5 as applied to arithmoi. Dedekind's work did not however cause the view that the natural numbers and iterative processes have a special foundational status to lose credit among most mathematicians. The Intuitionist movement, while sharing with Mayberry a rejection of a Platonist understanding of the meaning of mathematics, resorted to an operationalist understanding of the subject, driving an acceptance of indefinitely protracted iterative processes to the very heart of their thinking. The Formalist movement, following Hilbert's program of saving the mathematical fruits of Cantor's Axiom of Infinity via finitary consistency proofs, likewise, in the very definitions of formal systems and the establishment of their properties, accorded a special status to indefinite iteration and associated definitions by recursion and proofs by induction.

Mayberry's position is that all of this, right from Book V of Euclid, constitutes an aberration from the true spirit of mathematics as exemplified in Euclid Books I-IV. The central purpose of his book is to explain his position and to show that it is not corrosive of the essential content or the modern practice of mathematics, but, in his recommendation of a clearer Aristotelian understanding of what mathematics is about and the standard of rigour appropriate to his more exigent understanding of meaning, he is following in a tradition initiated by Cantor of restoring meaning to mathematics after three centuries of formalism. However, in Mayberry's eyes a modern platonically inspired doctrine that holds that say, proper classes, objectively exist is as much a departure from good sense and probable truthfulness as, say, the early 19th century formalistically inspired doctrine, Peacock's “Principle of the equivalence of Permanent Forms”.

Mayberry's positive philosophical views flow from his determined adherence to a small number of philosophical doctrines inspired partly by Aristotle and partly by reflection on the almost two and a half millennia of mathematical experience, particularly that of the 19th century.

=== Aristotelian realism ===
He is an Aristotelian realist in basic agreement with Aristotle's opinion that mathematics, and in particular the study of arithmoi, is a natural science taking its place alongside other special interest scientific subjects such as entomology or ornithology and dealing with objectively existing this-worldly things. Aristotle writes:

"Universal assertions in mathematics are not about separable entities which are beyond and apart from magnitudes and arithmoi. They are about these very things, only not qua such things as have magnitude or are divisible."

(What Aristotle means is that in geometry one treats the specific sizes of concrete objects as accidental and irrelevant to the geometer, and in arithmetic, one similarly ignores the fact that concrete units—men, pebbles etc.—may, in fact, be divisible.)

and elsewhere:

"Each science deals with its own domain, so that the science of the healthy is what studies something qua healthy and the science of man is what studies something qua man. And the same goes for geometry. The sciences of mathematics are not going to take perceptible entities as their domain just because the things they are about have the accidental feature of being perceptible (though, of course they are not studied qua perceptible). But, on the other hand, neither will they take as their domain some other entities separable from the perceptible ones."

The science that Mayberry concerns himself with is Arithmetic, understood both in a purified version of the sense Euclid gives the word in Books VII – IX, and also, as he claims, in the sense that Cantor has given the word. The first of Mayberry's core positions is agreement with Aristotle that the Arithmetician studies things and certain pluralities of things qua units and arithmoi in an essentially analogous way to the entomologist's study of things and certain pluralities of things qua insects and insect colonies. He accepts Euclid's lapidary definition of "unit", demurring only from Heath's translation of "εκαστον των οντων" as "each of the things that exist" as philosophically overloaded In regard to the definition of "arithmos" Mayberry would crucially prefix the word "multitude" in Euclid's definition—"An arithmos is a multitude composed of units"—with the word "definite". By this he means that arithmoi have definite objectively existing, bounds or limits – not in the sense that arithmoi are constrained in size or are amenable to any operational procedure such as counting out, or comprise exactly those things for which some linguistically formulated condition holds, but only in the sense that it is true of any individual thing that it is either in the arithmos or not in it. In particular conformity to Common Notion 5 (whole greater than the part) is not implied in the very concept "arithmos" but merely a judgement that all arithmoi possess, as it happens, this property. For pluralities defined by conformity to some condition or correspondence with some common noun – e.g. "arithmoi with more than three units" or "horses" – Mayberry uses the Aristotelian word "species". A species exists merely because we can conceive it: it is not an objective thing in the world but a thought in our heads, while the things that fall into a species may or may not coincide with an arithmos. Similar remarks apply to other conceptions such as "property"—e.g. that of being and ordinal or "global function" e.g. the Power Set and Union operators. Mayberry writes :

"The essential difference between sets and species is that sets exist whereas species do not. By this I mean that species are not objects: they are fictions or virtual objects."

"But it is essential to remember that in the final analysis - and all talk about global functions of the various sorts to the contrary notwithstanding - there are no such things as global functions: and when we speak of such functions we are ultimately talking about our own notational conventions for referring to sets."

=== Arithmos ===
The second of Mayberry's core philosophical doctrines is that things and arithmoi of things objectively exist and are part of the fabric of external reality. The ontological credentials of an arithmos are exactly those of its constituent units. It is not however the task of the mathematician to investigate or speculate whether things falling into a species – such as clouds in the sky, shades of red, human emotional states, men of the 22nd century – are sufficiently clearly individuated to constitute units of possible arithmoi or whether the boundaries of pluralities of things—e.g. should we count centaurs and mermaids as falling into the species "human kind"? is it exactly determined when shades of red end and shades of purple begin ?—are sufficiently clearly delineated as to constitute an arithmos. The work of the arithmetician can begin with the simple assumption that there are objective clearly individuated things which he can take as units and definite pluralities of such things that he can take as arithmoi. Mayberry writes:

"In Aristotle's conception of mathematical number we have the best vehicle yet devised to account for the facts of theoretical arithmetic. In arithmetical reasoning the mathematician regards things in the most abstract and general way conceivable, namely, only in so far as they are subject to the laws of identity and difference. That there are things subject to such laws he simply takes for granted."

and, a little later on:

"Number in the original sense, however – arithmoi – pluralities composed of units- these things are not like "natural numbers", mere fabrications of the mind, but on the contrary, are authentic inhabitants of the world, independent of human beings and their mental activity; they are things that we are obliged to acknowledge if we are to make any sense at all of our mathematical experience."

The third of Mayberry's core philosophical doctrines is that definitions made, properties defined, and arguments constructed using the quantifies "for all" and "there exist" are only intelligible, as statements of objective fact, if the scope of each quantifier is restricted to a definite arithmos. So, for instance, if we are dealing with girls, qua units, and know how to compare two girls in respect of the property "clever" we can sensibly say "Joan is the cleverest girl in her class" but not "Joan is the cleverest girl" tout court, as the latter statement purports to quantify over all the things falling into the species "girl". This stance gives him an additional reason to reject the foundational pretensions of the two classical first order axiomatic systems of Peano Arithmetic and Zermelo-Fraenkel set theory. Not only does he object to the operationalism inherent in the very construction of such formal systems, but he now also rejects the intelligibility of the free use of unrestricted quantifiers in the formation of predicates in the axiom schemata of Induction and Replacement.

Mayberry's fourth core doctrine is connected with his third. He affirms that in dealing with units and arithmoi—i.e. with things—we can unproblematically use classical logic, whereas in dealing with thoughts – such as species, global functions, general constructions properties etc. – the appropriate logic is intuitionistic. In particular if we know that the assumption "All members of the arithmos a possess the property P" implies an absurdity, then we can legitimately infer "there exists some member of a, x, for which P(x) does not hold". However, if we make a statement using a quantifier over a species e.g. "there exists some thing possessing P" or "P holds of all things" we are no longer reporting an objective fact that must be either the case or not the case. The affirmer of such a statement has to be understood as making a claim that he has in mind a justification of it – i.e. in the case of a universal quantifier, grounds for believing that given any conceivable thing P holds of it, or in the case of an existential quantifier, he knows of an instance of the species for which P holds. Since statements incorporating unrestricted quantifiers must be understood subjectively, it is clear that Excluded Middle principle is then simply not valid. For instance if the meaning of "For all things P holds" is "I have in mind a general construction to produce for each thing an argument that P holds of that thing" and the meaning of "there exist a thing for which P does not hold" is "I have in mind a construction to produce a thing for which P fails to hold." then I cannot necessarily assert that the disjunction is true as I may, for instance, have no constructions at all in mind. On this topic Mayberry writes:

"What are the logical principles that should govern global quantification? This is a difficult question and I am not confident that I can answer it in full. But I propose to adopt a partial answer, namely Brouwer’s Principle:
(i) Conventional (i.e. what Brouwer calls ‘classical’ ) logic is the logic of finite domains. In particular the mathematical laws of quantification apply only when the domains of quantification are finite. ["finite" here is being used in Mayberry’s sense of "definite" or "delimited" – the defining characteristic of arithmoi.]
(ii) Propositions that require global quantification for their expression cannot be assigned conventional truth values, true or false. They can only be classified as justified or unjustified.
...
Then in accordance with Brouwer’s Principle the assertion "for all objects x in S(x)" is not a conventional ("classical") proposition with a determinate truth value. It is not true or false but justified or unjustified.
To say that such a proposition is justified is to say that we have grounds for asserting that any proposition of the form (t) is true where t is any expression that denotes, or could denote an object. To say that an assertion is unjustified, on the other hand, is merely to say that we do not have such grounds; and that is not the same thing as saying that we have grounds for denying it."

Mayberry's fifth core doctrine is that, broadly in analogy with Euclid's postulates for Geometry, postulates for Arithmetic can be laid down, making a good a defect in the Elements which, contrary to the expectations created by the structure Common Notions and Postulates for Geometry, do not contain any such postulates. Mayberry carries out this program in Chapter 4 of his book. His postulates follow, to some degree Euclid in form, but the axiomatic ideas about sets issuing from the 19th and early 20th centuries, in content. Broadly analogous to Euclid's postulates on the construction of a circle given a point and a line or the construction of a unique straight line given two points are the postulates to do with Union, Power Set and Cartesian product which posit global constructions producing new arithmoi from one or more given ones. Somewhat different however are his postulates on Replacement and Comprehension. These do not set out individual constructions which simply have to be grasped but rather make affirmations about all possible constructions and all conceivable properties. In a sense one can understand them as affirming the existence of general bridges from thoughts to things. Both however can, like the postulates concerning specific constructions, be understood as "finiteness principles" affirming the existence of new arithmoi. Mayberry's "corrected" Euclid would thus underpin the sister disciplines of Geometry and Arithmetic with Common Notions, applicable to both, supplemented by two sets of Postulates, one for each discipline. Indeed, in so far as Geometry does rely on the notion of arithmos – it does so even in defining triangles, quadrilaterals, pentagons etc., but more exigently in some Propositions, e.g. Book VI Prop. 31, which make affirmations about general polygons—the "corrected" Euclid would place the study of Arithmoi before that of Geometry.

=== Euclid's Common Notion 5 ===
The final item of Mayberry's core philosophy is his belief that in Euclid's failure to recognise the force of Common Notion 5 – when applied to arithmoi a great historical opportunity was missed and, in his allowing himself definition by iteration, a huge misstep was taken whose consequences have ramified through the history of mathematics. Equipped with a proper appreciation of Common Notion 5 and eschewing iteration, a "corrected" Euclid would have pursued those parts of mathematics that are concerned with the finite – in addition to the actual modest content of Books 7–9, natural number theory, finite combinatorics, finite group and field theory and more generally the study of finite structures. Mayberry's calls this subject Euclidean Arithmetic and devotes a considerable part of his book to developing the basics of it. He is concerned in particular with establishing to what degree proof by induction and definition by recursion are at all warranted. He shows that, far from the Euclidean theory of arithmoi being a minor rework of modern natural number theory, in fact no viable notion of the natural numbers can be established in Euclidean Arithmetic. Complementing his view on Euclidean Arithmetic Mayberry takes the view that, just as an alternative Geometries were created by denying Euclid's axiom of parallels, an alternative Arithmetic is created by denying Common Notion 5 and affirming the existence of at least one arithmos for which the whole can be put in 1-1 correspondence with a part. This theory, which Mayberry would prefer to name Cantorian Arithmetic, is of course, modern set theory, which has shown itself capable (arguably) of subsuming all of mathematics and in particular the Geometry which, in the Euclidean dispensation of adherence to Common Notion 5, is a separate sister discipline of Arithmetic.

Mayberry's philosophy seeks to impose a new standard, flowing from his ontological and semantic convictions, of clarity and rigour on mathematics to be achieved in the first instance through a program of systematic separation of Euclidean from Cantorian mathematics. In the Euclidean case this standard would require practitioners both of Geometry and Arithmetic to eschew all appeal to iterative processes. The consequent most immediate challenge in Geometry is to "correct" Euclid by establishing the theorems of Book VI on the basis of the methods and techniques of Books I-IV, avoiding the use of the ratio concept introduced in Book V. For Arithmetic the corresponding challenge is to establish the results of Book VII-IX without resort to the sort of iterative procedure that Euclid allows himself in the definition of multiplication. (Book VII, Definition 15.) For Cantorian Arithmetic the main challenge would be to show that the great body of infinitary mathematics—the disciplines flowing in one way or another from the calculus—does not require unbounded quantifiers and consequently that the instances of the Replacement Schema of the Zermelo-Fraenkel axioms for set theory involving such quantifiers, are, as well as being disallowed by Mayberry's general philosophy, in any case technically redundant.
