= Definitions of mathematics =

Mathematics has no generally accepted definition. Different schools of thought, particularly in philosophy, have put forth radically different definitions. All are controversial.

== Early definitions ==
Aristotle defined mathematics as:

The science of quantity.

In Aristotle's classification of the sciences, discrete quantities were studied by arithmetic, continuous quantities by geometry. Aristotle also thought that quantity alone does not distinguish mathematics from sciences like physics; in his view, abstraction and studying quantity as a property "separable in thought" from real instances set mathematics apart.

Auguste Comte's definition tried to explain the role of mathematics in coordinating phenomena in all other fields:

The science of indirect measurement. Auguste Comte 1851

The "indirectness" in Comte's definition refers to determining quantities that cannot be measured directly, such as the distance to planets or the size of atoms, by means of their relations to quantities that can be measured directly.

== Greater abstraction and competing philosophical schools ==
The preceding kinds of definitions, which had prevailed since Aristotle's time, were abandoned in the 19th century as new branches of mathematics were developed, which bore no obvious relation to measurement or the physical world, such as group theory, projective geometry, and non-Euclidean geometry.

Three leading types of definition of mathematics today are called logicist, intuitionist, and formalist, each reflecting a different philosophy of mathematics. Each has its own flaws, none has achieved mainstream consensus, and all three appear irreconcilable.

=== Logicism ===
With mathematicians pursuing greater rigor and more abstract foundations, some proposed defining mathematics purely in terms of deduction and logic:

Mathematics is the science that draws necessary conclusions. Benjamin Peirce 1870

All Mathematics is Symbolic Logic. Bertrand Russell 1903

Peirce did not think that mathematics is the same as logic, since he thought mathematics makes only hypothetical assertions, not categorical ones. Russell's definition, on the other hand, expresses the logicist view without reservation.

=== Intuitionism ===
Rather than characterize mathematics by deductive logic, intuitionism views mathematics as primarily about the construction of ideas in the mind:

The only possible foundation of mathematics must be sought in this construction under the obligation carefully to watch which constructions intuition allows and which not. L. E. J. Brouwer 1907

... intuitionist mathematics is nothing more nor less than an investigation of the utmost limits which the intellect can attain in its self-unfolding. Arend Heyting 1968

Intuitionism sprang from the philosophy of mathematician L. E. J. Brouwer and also led to the development of a modified intuitionistic logic. As a result, intuitionism has generated some genuinely different results that, while coherent and valid, differ from some theorems grounded in classical logic.

=== Formalism ===
Formalism denies logical or intuitive meanings altogether, making the symbols and rules themselves the objects of study. A formalist definition:

Mathematics is the science of formal systems. Haskell Curry 1951

=== Other views ===
Still other definitions emphasize pattern, order, or structure. For example:

Mathematics is the classification and study of all possible patterns. Walter Warwick Sawyer, 1955

Yet another approach makes abstraction the defining criterion:

Mathematics is a broad-ranging field of study in which the properties and interactions of idealized objects are examined.

== Contemporary general reference works ==
Most contemporary reference works define mathematics by summarizing its main topics and methods:

The abstract science which investigates deductively the conclusions implicit in the elementary conceptions of spatial and numerical relations, and which includes as its main divisions geometry, arithmetic, and algebra. Oxford English Dictionary, 1933

The study of the measurement, properties, and relationships of quantities and sets, using numbers and symbols. American Heritage Dictionary, 2000

The science of structure, order, and relation that has evolved from elemental practices of counting, measuring, and describing the shapes of objects. Encyclopædia Britannica, 2006

== Playful, metaphorical, and poetic definitions ==
Bertrand Russell wrote this famous tongue-in-cheek definition, describing the way all terms in mathematics are ultimately defined by reference to undefined terms:

The subject in which we never know what we are talking about, nor whether what we are saying is true. Bertrand Russell 1901

Many other attempts to characterize mathematics have led to humor or poetic prose:

A mathematician is a blind man in a dark room looking for a black cat which isn't there. Charles Darwin

A mathematician, like a painter or poet, is a maker of patterns. If his patterns are more permanent than theirs, it is because they are made with ideas. G. H. Hardy, 1940

Mathematics is the art of giving the same name to different things. Henri Poincaré

Mathematics is the science of skillful operations with concepts and rules invented just for this purpose. [this purpose being the skillful operation ....] Eugene Wigner

Mathematics is not a book confined within a cover and bound between brazen clasps, whose contents it needs only patience to ransack; it is not a mine, whose treasures may take long to reduce into possession, but which fill only a limited number of veins and lodes; it is not a soil, whose fertility can be exhausted by the yield of successive harvests; it is not a continent or an ocean, whose area can be mapped out and its contour defined: it is limitless as that space which it finds too narrow for its aspirations; its possibilities are as infinite as the worlds which are forever crowding in and multiplying upon the astronomer's gaze; it is as incapable of being restricted within assigned boundaries or being reduced to definitions of permanent validity, as the consciousness of life, which seems to slumber in each monad, in every atom of matter, in each leaf and bud cell, and is forever ready to burst forth into new forms of vegetable and animal existence. James Joseph Sylvester

What is mathematics? What is it for? What are mathematicians doing nowadays? Wasn't it all finished long ago? How many new numbers can you invent anyway? Is today's mathematics just a matter of huge calculations, with the mathematician as a kind of zookeeper, making sure the precious computers are fed and watered? If it's not, what is it other than the incomprehensible outpourings of superpowered brainboxes with their heads in the clouds and their feet dangling from the lofty balconies of their ivory towers? Mathematics is all of these, and none. Mostly, it's just different. It's not what you expect it to be, you turn your back for a moment and it's changed. It's certainly not just a fixed body of knowledge, its growth is not confined to inventing new numbers, and its hidden tendrils pervade every aspect of modern life. Ian Stewart

== See also ==
- Philosophy of mathematics
- Foundations of mathematics
