= Where Mathematics Comes From =

2000 mathematics book by Lakoff & Núñez

- Author: George Lakoff; Rafael E. Núñez
- Subject: Numerical cognition
- Published: 2000
- Pages: 492
- ISBN: 978-0-465-03771-1
- OCLC: 44045671

Where Mathematics Comes From: How the Embodied Mind Brings Mathematics into Being (hereinafter WMCF) is a book by George Lakoff, a cognitive linguist, and Rafael E. Núñez, a psychologist. Published in 2000, WMCF seeks to found a cognitive science of mathematics, a theory of embodied mathematics based on conceptual metaphor.

== WMCF definition of mathematics ==
Mathematics makes up that part of the human conceptual system that is special in the following way:

It is precise, consistent, stable across time and human communities, symbolizable, calculable, generalizable, universally available, consistent within each of its subject matters, and effective as a general tool for description, explanation, and prediction in a vast number of everyday activities, [ranging from] sports, to building, business, technology, and science. - WMCF, pp. 50, 377

Nikolay Lobachevsky said "There is no branch of mathematics, however abstract, which may not some day be applied to phenomena of the real world." A common type of conceptual blending process would seem to apply to the entire mathematical procession.

== Human cognition and mathematics ==
The complex plane: a visual metaphor of the abstract idea of a complex number, which allows operations on complex numbers to be visualized as simple motions through ordinary space

Lakoff and Núñez's avowed purpose is to begin laying the foundations for a truly scientific understanding of mathematics, one grounded in processes common to all human cognition. They find that four distinct but related processes metaphorically structure basic arithmetic: object collection, object construction, using a measuring stick, and moving along a path.

WMCF builds on earlier books by Lakoff (1987) and Lakoff and Johnson (1980, 1999), which analyze such concepts of metaphor and image schemata from second-generation cognitive science. Some of the concepts in these earlier books, such as the interesting technical ideas in Lakoff (1987), are absent from WMCF.

Lakoff and Núñez hold that mathematics results from the human cognitive apparatus and must therefore be understood in cognitive terms. WMCF advocates (and includes some examples of) a cognitive idea analysis of mathematics which analyzes mathematical ideas in terms of the human experiences, metaphors, generalizations, and other cognitive mechanisms giving rise to them. A standard mathematical education does not develop such idea analysis techniques because it does not pursue considerations of A) what structures of the mind allow it to do mathematics or B) the philosophy of mathematics.

Lakoff and Núñez start by reviewing the psychological literature, concluding that human beings appear to have an innate ability, called subitizing, to count, add, and subtract up to about 4 or 5. They document this conclusion by reviewing the literature, published in recent decades, describing experiments with infant subjects. For example, infants quickly become excited or curious when presented with "impossible" situations, such as having three toys appear when only two were initially present.

The authors argue that mathematics goes far beyond this very elementary level due to a large number of metaphorical constructions. For example, the Pythagorean position that all is number, and the associated crisis of confidence that came about with the discovery of the irrationality of the square root of two, arises solely from a metaphorical relation between the length of the diagonal of a square, and the possible numbers of objects.

Much of WMCF deals with the important concepts of infinity and of limit processes, seeking to explain how finite humans living in a finite world could ultimately conceive of the actual infinite. Thus much of WMCF is, in effect, a study of the epistemological foundations of the calculus. Lakoff and Núñez conclude that while the potential infinite is not metaphorical, the actual infinite is. Moreover, they deem all manifestations of actual infinity to be instances of what they call the "Basic Metaphor of Infinity", as represented by the ever-increasing sequence 1, 2, 3, ...

WMCF emphatically rejects the Platonistic philosophy of mathematics. They emphasize that all we know and can ever know is human mathematics, the mathematics arising from the human intellect. The question of whether there is a "transcendent" mathematics independent of human thought is a meaningless question, like asking if colors are transcendent of human thought—colors are only varying wavelengths of light, it is our interpretation of physical stimuli that make them colors.

WMCF (p. 81) likewise criticizes the emphasis mathematicians place on the concept of closure. Lakoff and Núñez argue that the expectation of closure is an artifact of the human mind's ability to relate fundamentally different concepts via metaphor.

WMCF concerns itself mainly with proposing and establishing an alternative view of mathematics, one grounding the field in the realities of human biology and experience. It is not a work of technical mathematics or philosophy. Lakoff and Núñez are not the first to argue that conventional approaches to the philosophy of mathematics are flawed. For example, they do not seem all that familiar with the content of Davis and Hersh (1981), even though the book warmly acknowledges Hersh's support.

Lakoff and Núñez cite Saunders Mac Lane (the inventor, with Samuel Eilenberg, of category theory) in support of their position. Mathematics, Form and Function (1986), an overview of mathematics intended for philosophers, proposes that mathematical concepts are ultimately grounded in ordinary human activities, mostly interactions with the physical world.

== Examples of mathematical metaphors ==
Conceptual metaphors described in WMCF, in addition to the Basic Metaphor of Infinity, include:

- Arithmetic is motion along a path, object collection/construction;
- Change is motion;
- Sets are containers, objects;
- Continuity is gapless;
- Mathematical systems have an "essence," namely their axiomatic algebraic structure;
- Functions are sets of ordered pairs, curves in the Cartesian plane;
- Geometric figures are objects in space;
- Logical independence is geometric orthogonality;
- Numbers are sets, object collections, physical segments, points on a line;
- Recurrence is circular.

Mathematical reasoning requires variables ranging over some universe of discourse, so that we can reason about generalities rather than merely about particulars. WMCF argues that reasoning with such variables implicitly relies on what it terms the Fundamental Metonymy of Algebra.

== Example of metaphorical ambiguity ==
WMCF (p. 151) includes the following example of what the authors term "metaphorical ambiguity." Take the set $A = \{\{\emptyset\},\{\emptyset, \{\emptyset\}\}\}.$ Then recall two bits of standard terminology from elementary set theory:

1. The recursive construction of the ordinal natural numbers, whereby 0 is $\empty$, and $n+1$ is $n \cup \{n\}.$
2. The ordered pair (a,b), defined as $\{\{a\},\{a,b\}\}.$

By (1), A is the set {1,2}. But (1) and (2) together say that A is also the ordered pair (0,1). Both statements cannot be correct; the ordered pair (0,1) and the unordered pair {1,2} are fully distinct concepts. Lakoff and Johnson (1999) term this situation "metaphorically ambiguous." This simple example calls into question any Platonistic foundations for mathematics.

While (1) and (2) above are admittedly canonical, especially within the consensus set theory known as the Zermelo–Fraenkel axiomatization, WMCF does not let on that they are but one of several definitions that have been proposed since the dawning of set theory. For example, Frege, Principia Mathematica, and New Foundations (a body of axiomatic set theory begun by Quine in 1937) define cardinals and ordinals as equivalence classes under the relations of equinumerosity and similarity, so that this conundrum does not arise. In Quinian set theory, A is simply an instance of the number 2. For technical reasons, defining the ordered pair as in (2) above is awkward in Quinian set theory. Two solutions have been proposed:

- A variant set-theoretic definition of the ordered pair more complicated than the usual one;
- Taking ordered pairs as primitive.

== The "Romance of Mathematics" ==
The "Romance of Mathematics" is WMCF's light-hearted term for a perennial philosophical viewpoint about mathematics which the authors describe and then dismiss as an intellectual myth:

- Mathematics is transcendent, namely it exists independently of human beings, and structures our actual physical universe and any possible universe. Mathematics is the language of nature, and is the primary conceptual structure we would have in common with extraterrestrial aliens, if any such there be.
- Mathematical proof is the gateway to a realm of transcendent truth.
- Reasoning is logic, and logic is essentially mathematical. Hence mathematics structures all possible reasoning.
- Because mathematics exists independently of human beings, and reasoning is essentially mathematical, reason itself is disembodied. Therefore, artificial intelligence is possible, at least in principle.

WMCF will eventually prove to be the start of a new school in the philosophy of mathematics. Hence the main value of WMCF so far may be a critical one: its critique of Platonism and romanticism in mathematics.

== Critical response ==
Many working mathematicians resist the approach and conclusions of Lakoff and Núñez. Reviews of WMCF by mathematicians in professional journals, while often respectful of its focus on conceptual strategies and metaphors as paths for understanding mathematics, have taken exception to some of the WMCF's philosophical arguments on the grounds that mathematical statements have lasting 'objective' meanings. For example, Fermat's Last Theorem means exactly what it meant when Fermat initially proposed it in 1664. Other reviewers have pointed out that multiple conceptual strategies can be employed in connection with the same mathematically defined term, often by the same person (a point that is compatible with the view that we routinely understand the 'same' concept with different metaphors). The metaphor and the conceptual strategy are not the same as the formal definition which mathematicians employ. However, WMCF points out that formal definitions are built using words and symbols that have meaning only in terms of human experience.

Critiques of WMCF include the humorous:

It's difficult for me to conceive of a metaphor for a real number raised to a complex power, but if there is one, I'd sure like to see it. — Joseph Auslander

and the physically informed:

But their analysis leaves at least a couple of questions insufficiently answered. For one thing, the authors ignore the fact that brains not only observe nature, but also are part of nature. Perhaps the math that brains invent takes the form it does because math had a hand in forming the brains in the first place (through the operation of natural laws in constraining the evolution of life). Furthermore, it's one thing to fit equations to aspects of reality that are already known. It's something else for that math to tell of phenomena never previously suspected. When Paul Dirac's equations describing electrons produced more than one solution, he surmised that nature must possess other particles, now known as antimatter. But scientists did not discover such particles until after Dirac's math told him they must exist. If math is a human invention, nature seems to know what was going to be invented.

Lakoff and Núñez tend to dismiss the negative opinions mathematicians have expressed about WMCF, because their critics do not appreciate the insights of cognitive science. Lakoff and Núñez maintain that their argument can only be understood using the discoveries of recent decades about the way human brains process language and meaning. They argue that any arguments or criticisms that are not grounded in this understanding cannot address the content of the book.

It has been pointed out that it is not at all clear that WMCF establishes that the claim "intelligent alien life would have mathematical ability" is a myth. To do this, it would be required to show that intelligence and mathematical ability are separable, and this has not been done. On Earth, intelligence and mathematical ability seem to go hand in hand in all life-forms, as pointed out by Keith Devlin among others. The authors of WMCF have not explained how this situation would (or even could) be different anywhere else.

Lakoff and Núñez also appear not to appreciate the extent to which intuitionists and constructivists have presaged their attack on the Romance of (Platonic) Mathematics. Brouwer, the founder of the intuitionist/constructivist point of view, in his dissertation On the Foundation of Mathematics, argued that mathematics was a mental construction, a free creation of the mind and totally independent of logic and language. He goes on to criticize the formalists for building verbal structures that are studied without intuitive interpretation. Symbolic language should not be confused with mathematics; it reflects, but does not contain, mathematical reality.

Educators have taken some interest in what WMCF suggests about how mathematics is learned, and why students find some elementary concepts more difficult than others.

However, even from an educational perspective, WMCF is still problematic. From the conceptual metaphor theory's point of view, metaphors reside in a different realm, the abstract, from that of 'real world', the concrete. In other words, despite their claim of mathematics being human, established mathematical knowledge — which is what we learn in school — is assumed to be and treated as abstract, completely detached from its physical origin. It cannot account for the way learners could access to such knowledge.

WMCF is also criticized for its monist approach. First, it ignores the fact that the sensori-motor experience upon which our linguistic structure — thus, mathematics — is assumed to be based may vary across cultures and situations. Second, the mathematics WMCF is concerned with is "almost entirely... standard utterances in textbooks and curricula", which is the most-well established body of knowledge. It is negligent of the dynamic and diverse nature of the history of mathematics.

WMCF's logo-centric approach is another target for critics. While it is predominantly interested in the association between language and mathematics, it does not account for how non-linguistic factors contribute to the emergence of mathematical ideas (e.g. See Radford, 2009; Rotman, 2008).

== Summing up ==
WMCF (pp. 378–79) concludes with some key points, a number of which follow. Mathematics arises from our bodies and brains, our everyday experiences, and the concerns of human societies and cultures. It is:

- The result of normal adult cognitive capacities, in particular the capacity for conceptual metaphor, and as such is a human universal. The ability to construct conceptual metaphors is neurologically based, and enables humans to reason about one domain using the language and concepts of another domain. Conceptual metaphor is both what enabled mathematics to grow out of everyday activities, and what enables mathematics to grow by a continual process of analogy and abstraction;
- Symbolic, thereby enormously facilitating precise calculation;
- Not transcendent, but the result of human evolution and culture, to which it owes its effectiveness. During experience of the world a connection to mathematical ideas is going on within the human mind;
- A system of human concepts making extraordinary use of the ordinary tools of human cognition;
- An open-ended creation of human beings, who remain responsible for maintaining and extending it;
- One of the greatest products of the collective human imagination, and a magnificent example of the beauty, richness, complexity, diversity, and importance of human ideas.

The cognitive approach to formal systems, as described and implemented in WMCF, need not be confined to mathematics, but should also prove fruitful when applied to formal logic, and to formal philosophy such as Edward Zalta's theory of abstract objects. Lakoff and Johnson (1999) fruitfully employ the cognitive approach to rethink a good deal of the philosophy of mind, epistemology, metaphysics, and the history of ideas.

== See also ==
- Abstract object
- Cognitive science
- Cognitive science of mathematics
- Conceptual metaphor
- Embodied philosophy
- Foundations of mathematics
- From Action to Mathematics per Mac Lane
- Metaphor
- Philosophy of mathematics
- The Unreasonable Effectiveness of Mathematics in the Natural Sciences
