= Bob Hale (philosopher) =

British philosopher (1945–2017)

Bob Hale FRSE
- Born: Robert Lorne Victor Hale; 4 May 1945
- Died: 12 December 2017 (aged 72)

Education
- Education: Linacre College, Oxford

Philosophical work
- Era: Contemporary philosophy
- Region: Western philosophy
- School: Analytic philosophy Neo-logicism (Scottish school)
- Institutions: University of Sheffield
- Main interests: Philosophy of mathematics, philosophy of language, modal logic
- Notable ideas: Neo-logicism, essentialist theory of modality

Robert Lorne Victor Hale (4 May 1945 – 12 December 2017) was a British philosopher, known for his contributions to the development of the neo-Fregean (neo-logicist) philosophy of mathematics in collaboration with Crispin Wright, and for his works in modality and philosophy of language.

== Career ==
Hale obtained a BPhil in philosophy in 1967 from Linacre College, University of Oxford. From 2006 until his death, he was a professor of philosophy in the department of philosophy at the University of Sheffield. Prior to that, he taught in the University of Glasgow, the University of St. Andrews and the University of Lancaster.

Hale produced the first published neo-Fregean construction of the real numbers. In his book (Necessary Beings), he argues for an essentialist theory of necessity and possibility.

== Notable positions ==
- British Academy Research Reader (1997–99)
- Fellow of the Royal Society of Edinburgh (from 2000)
- President of the Aristotelian Society (2002–03)
- Leverhulme Senior Research Fellow (2009–11)

== Selected works ==
- (1987) Abstract Objects. Oxford: Blackwell Publishing.
- (1997) Co-editor with Crispin Wright. The Blackwell Companion to the Philosophy of Language. Oxford: Blackwell Publishing.
- (2001) With Crispin Wright. The Reason's Proper Study: Essays towards a Neo-Fregean Philosophy of Mathematics. Oxford: Oxford University Press.
- (2013) Necessary Beings – An Essay on Ontology, Modality, and the Relations Between Them Oxford: Oxford University Press.
