= The Unreasonable Effectiveness of Mathematics in the Natural Sciences =

1960 article by Eugene Wigner

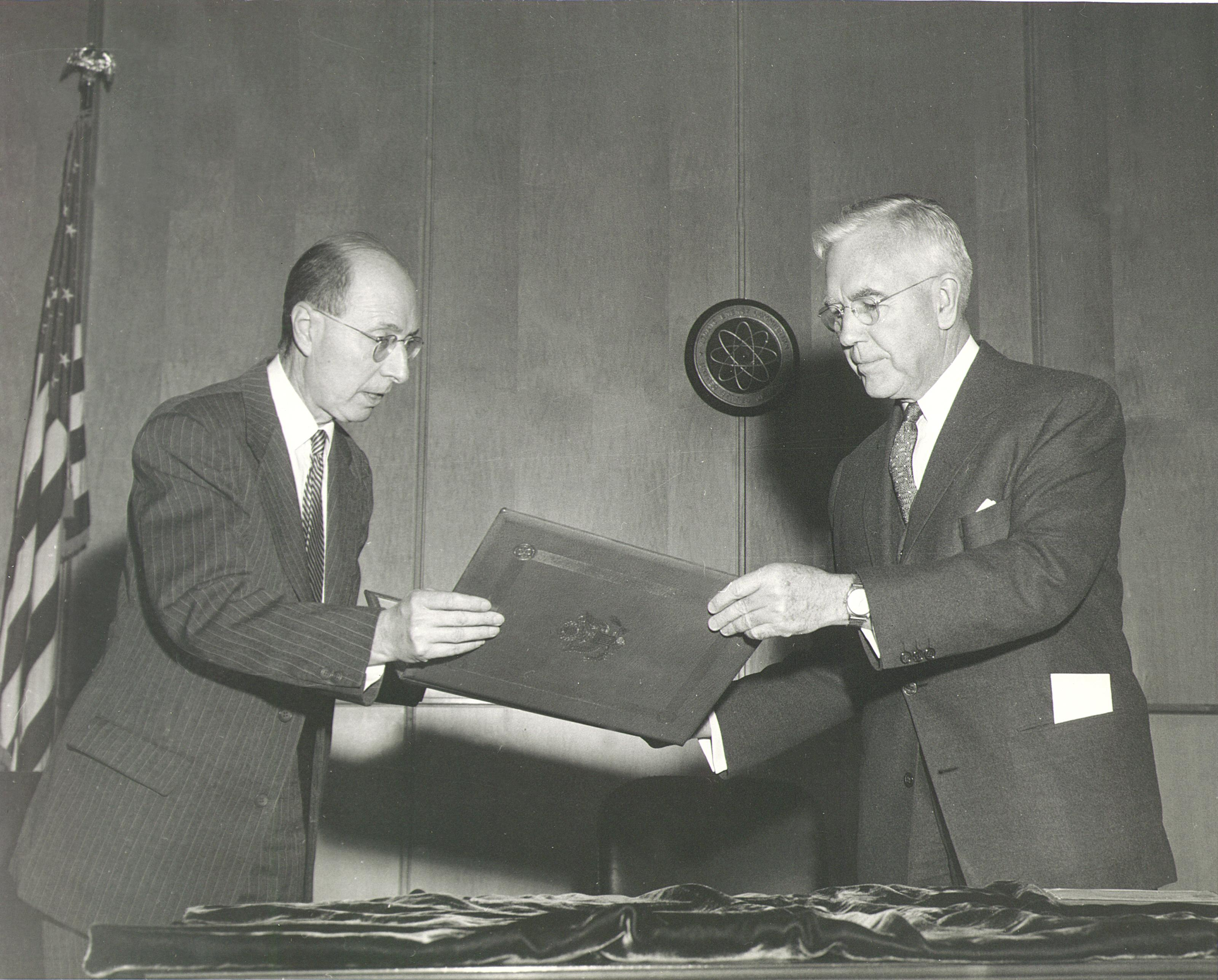
Wigner (left) in 1958, receiving the Enrico Fermi Award from John McCone.

"The Unreasonable Effectiveness of Mathematics in the Natural Sciences" was the title of the 1959 Richard Courant Lecture in Mathematical Sciences, delivered at New York University by the physicist Eugene Wigner, and published in Communication in Pure and Applied Mathematics in 1960. In it, Wigner observes that pure mathematical concepts that have been developed and studied independently of physics, often so mathematicians can show their “ingenuity and sense of formal beauty”, nevertheless often find applications in physics. The mathematical structure of theoretical physics often points the way to further advances in that theory and has empirical predictive power in describing nature. Albert Einstein and the philosopher Alfred North Whitehead had previously thought that the success of abstract mathematics in physical science was a mystery that required explanation, but Wigner's lecture became the classic statement of the problem.

== Observations and arguments ==
Wigner argues that mathematical concepts have applicability far beyond the context in which they were originally developed. He writes: "It is important to point out that the mathematical formulation of the physicist's often crude experience leads in an uncanny number of cases to an amazingly accurate description of a large class of phenomena." He adds that the observation "the laws of nature are written in the language of mathematics," properly made by Galileo three hundred years ago, "is now truer than ever before."

Wigner's first example is the law of gravitation formulated by Isaac Newton. Originally used to model freely falling bodies on the surface of the Earth, this law was extended based on what Wigner terms "very scanty observations" to describe the motion of the planets, where it "has proved accurate beyond all reasonable expectations." Wigner says that "Newton ... noted that the parabola of the thrown rock's path on the earth and the circle of the moon's path in the sky are particular cases of the same mathematical object of an ellipse, and postulated the universal law of gravitation on the basis of a single, and at that time very approximate, numerical coincidence."

Wigner's second example comes from quantum mechanics: Max Born "noticed that some rules of computation, given by Heisenberg, were formally identical with the rules of computation with matrices, established a long time before by mathematicians. Born, Jordan, and Heisenberg then proposed to replace by matrices the position and momentum variables of the equations of classical mechanics. They applied the rules of matrix mechanics to a few highly idealized problems and the results were quite satisfactory. However, there was, at that time, no rational evidence that their matrix mechanics would prove correct under more realistic conditions." But Wolfgang Pauli found their work accurately described the hydrogen atom: "This application gave results in agreement with experience." The helium atom, with two electrons, is more complex, but "nevertheless, the calculation of the lowest energy level of helium, as carried out a few months ago by Kinoshita at Cornell and by Bazley at the Bureau of Standards, agrees with the experimental data within the accuracy of the observations, which is one part in ten million. Surely in this case we 'got something out' of the equations that we did not put in." The same is true of the atomic spectra of heavier elements.

Wigner's last example comes from quantum electrodynamics: "Whereas Newton's theory of gravitation still had obvious connections with experience, experience entered the formulation of matrix mechanics only in the refined or sublimated form of Heisenberg's prescriptions. The quantum theory of the Lamb shift, as conceived by Bethe and established by Schwinger, is a purely mathematical theory and the only direct contribution of experiment was to show the existence of a measurable effect. The agreement with calculation is better than one part in a thousand."

== Other examples ==
There are examples beyond the ones mentioned by Wigner. Another often cited example is Maxwell's equations, derived to model the elementary electrical and magnetic phenomena known in the mid-19th century. The equations also describe radio waves, discovered by David Edward Hughes in 1879, around the time of James Clerk Maxwell's death. Also, one should not forget the General Relativity Theory of Einstein, which would not have been possible without the development of Tensor Analysis by a series of great mathematicians such as Gauss, Riemann, Christoffel, Ricci-Curbastro, Tullio Levi-Civita and others.

== Responses ==
The responses the thesis received include:

- Richard Hamming in computer science, "The Unreasonable Effectiveness of Mathematics".
- Arthur Lesk in molecular biology, "The Unreasonable Effectiveness of Mathematics in Molecular Biology".
- Peter Norvig in artificial intelligence, "The Unreasonable Effectiveness of Data"
- Max Tegmark in physics, "The Mathematical Universe".
- Ivor Grattan-Guinness in mathematics, "Solving Wigner's mystery: The reasonable (though perhaps limited) effectiveness of mathematics in the natural sciences".
- Vela Velupillai in economics, "The Unreasonable Ineffectiveness of Mathematics in Economics".
- Terrence Joseph Sejnowski in Artificial Intelligence: "The Unreasonable Effectiveness of Deep Learning in Artificial Intelligence".

=== Richard Hamming ===
Mathematician and Turing Award laureate Richard Hamming reflected on and extended Wigner's Unreasonable Effectiveness in 1980, discussing four "partial explanations" for it, and concluding that they were unsatisfactory. They were:

1. Humans see what they look for. The belief that science is experimentally grounded is only partially true. Hamming gives four examples of nontrivial physical phenomena he believes arose from the mathematical tools employed and not from the intrinsic properties of physical reality.

- Hamming proposes that Galileo discovered the law of falling bodies not by experimenting, but by simple, though careful, thinking. Hamming imagines Galileo as having engaged in the following thought experiment (the experiment, which Hamming calls "scholastic reasoning", is described in Galileo's book On Motion.):

Suppose that a falling body broke into two pieces. Of course, the two pieces would immediately slow down to their appropriate speeds. But suppose further that one piece happened to touch the other one. Would they now be one piece and both speed up? Suppose I tie the two pieces together. How tightly must I do it to make them one piece? A light string? A rope? Glue? When are two pieces one?

There is simply no way a falling body can "answer" such hypothetical "questions." Hence Galileo would have concluded that "falling bodies need not know anything if they all fall with the same velocity, unless interfered with by another force." After coming up with this argument, Hamming found a related discussion in Pólya (1963: 83-85). Hamming's account does not reveal an awareness of the 20th-century scholarly debate over just what Galileo did.

- The inverse square law of universal gravitation necessarily follows from the conservation of energy and of space having three dimensions. Measuring the exponent in the law of universal gravitation is more a test of whether space is Euclidean than a test of the properties of the gravitational field.
- The inequality at the heart of the uncertainty principle of quantum mechanics follows from the properties of Fourier integrals and from assuming time invariance.
- Hamming argues that Albert Einstein's pioneering work on special relativity was largely "scholastic" in its approach. He knew from the outset what the theory should look like (although he only knew this because of the Michelson–Morley experiment), and explored candidate theories with mathematical tools, not actual experiments. Hamming alleges that Einstein was so confident that his relativity theories were correct that the outcomes of observations designed to test them did not much interest him. If the observations were inconsistent with his theories, it would be the observations that were at fault.

2. Humans create and select the mathematics that fit a situation. The mathematics at hand does not always work. For example, when mere scalars proved awkward for understanding forces, first vectors, then tensors, were invented.

3. Mathematics addresses only a part of human experience. Much of human experience does not fall under science or mathematics but under the philosophy of value, including ethics, aesthetics, and political philosophy. To assert that the world can be explained via mathematics amounts to an act of faith.

4. Evolution has primed humans to think mathematically. The earliest lifeforms must have contained the seeds of the human ability to create and follow long chains of close reasoning.

=== Ivor Grattan-Guinness ===
Ivor Grattan-Guinness found the effectiveness in question eminently reasonable and explicable in terms of concepts such as analogy, generalization, and metaphor. He emphasizes that Wigner largely ignores "the effectiveness of the natural sciences in mathematics, in that much mathematics has been motivated by interpretations in the sciences".

=== Michael Atiyah ===
The tables were turned by Michael Atiyah with his essay "The unreasonable effectiveness of physics in mathematics." He argued that the toolbox of physics enables a practitioner like Edward Witten to go beyond standard mathematics, in particular the geometry of 4-manifolds. The tools of a physicist are cited as quantum field theory, special relativity, non-abelian gauge theory, spin, chirality, supersymmetry, and the electromagnetic duality.

== Prior versions of the argument ==
German scholar Moritz Drobisch was known to have revered the "mathematical fundament" of most sciences, as it put students in the position to "awe at the teleological coherence" and "recognise a superhuman, ordering wisdom whose purposes [...] [they] will gradually understand". Relevantly, he stated of astronomy:

[T]he harmonious order, in which the celestial bodies describe their orbits, the eternally consistent regularity, touches a deep sounding string within us and elevates us – far from just letting the dead mechanism of chance unwind before us – to the notion of the supreme wise being.

== See also ==
- Cosmology
- Foundations of mathematics
- Mark Steiner
- Mathematical universe hypothesis
- Philosophy of science
- Quasi-empiricism in mathematics
- Relationship between mathematics and physics
- Scientific structuralism
- Unreasonable ineffectiveness of mathematics
- Where Mathematics Comes From
