= Philosophia Mathematica =

- Discipline: Logic
- Language: English

Publication details
- Publisher: Oxford University Press

Standard abbreviations
- ISO 4: Philos. Math.

Indexing
- ISSN: 0031-8019 (print); 1744-6406 (web)

Links
- Journal homepage

Philosophia Mathematica is a philosophical journal devoted to the philosophy of mathematics, published by Oxford University Press. The journal publishes three issues per year.
