= Shu-Heng Chen =

Taiwanese economist (born 1959)

Shu-Heng Chen (Chinese: 陳樹衡; born 25 November 1959) is a Taiwanese economist and currently a professor at the Department of Economics at National Chengchi University. He is also the founder and director of the AI-ECON Research Center at the National Chengchi University.

His contributions are in the area of computational approach to understanding economic and finance problems, in particular, the use of heterogenous agent-based approach and genetic programming in economics. He is considered one of the pioneers in the field of agent-based computational economics and the first to introduce genetic programming into ACE. He takes a biologically-inspired approach in modeling the boundedly rational behavior of agents and is influenced by the work of Herbert A. Simon.
