= Vela Velupillai =

Academic economist

Kumaraswamy (Vela) Velupillai
- Born: September 25, 1947; Colombo, British Ceylon (present-day Sri Lanka)
- Education: University of Kyoto; University of Lund; University of Cambridge
- Scientific career
- Fields: Computable Economics; Macroeconomic Theory; History of economic thought Philosophy of Economics
- Workplaces: University of Trento, Italy; New School for Social Research, Italy
- Doctoral advisor: Richard Goodwin

Kumaraswamy (Vela) Velupillai (born 1947) is an academic economist and a Senior Visiting Professor at the Madras School of Economics and was, formerly, (Distinguished) Professor of Economics at the New School for Social Research in New York City and Professore di Chiara Fama in the Department of Economics at the University of Trento, Italy.

== Current work ==
His work is almost entirely devoted to Computable Economics, Macroeconomic Theory and the History and Philosophy of Economics. Within Computable Economics, his major focus has been an attempt to mathematize economic theory—both micro and macro theory—using the methods of recursion theory and constructive mathematics.

== Education ==
His high school education was at Royal College Colombo. He obtained his undergraduate degree from the Faculty of Engineering at Kyoto University, Kyoto, Japan; he obtained a master's degree in economics at the Department of Economics, University of Lund, Lund, Sweden and a PhD in economics at Cambridge University (King's College). His PhD supervisor, initially, was Lord Kaldor and, subsequently, and decisively, Richard Goodwin.

== Academic posts ==
He has held tenured and visiting appointments at the European University Institute, Fiesole, Italy, UCLA, the People's University in Beijing and several other European Universities and Research Institutions. He is the founder of the Algorithmic Social Sciences Research Unit at the University of Trento.

A Festschrift in Vela Velupillai's honour, Computable, Constructive and Behavioural Economic Dynamics, edited by Stefano Zambelli, was published by Routledge. A Special Issue of the journal New Mathematics and Natural Computation, edited by Shu-Heng, in honour of Vela Velupillai, was published in March 2012.

== Influences ==
He lists, in an autobiographical statement, those who have influenced him, in his visions of economics. They are, primarily, the following:

- Björn Thalberg and Gunnar Myrdal: The Oslo tradition of Ragnar Frisch and Trygve Haavelmo and The Swedish tradition of Knut Wicksell, Erik Lindahl, Gunnar Myrdal, Dag Hammarskjöld and Erik Lundberg
- Cambridge iconoclasm: Nicholas Kaldor, Piero Sraffa, Geoff Harcourt and, in particular, Richard Goodwin
- John Hicks, Robert Clower, John McCall, and Dick Day: Critical traditions of neo-classical economics.
- Lance Taylor: Development Economics
- Herbert A. Simon: Classical Behavioural Economics.
- Tony Lawson: Economic Methodology
- Other mathematical, epistemological and philosophical intellectual influences: Guglielmo Chiodi, Stefano Zambelli, Alan Turing, Luitzen Brouwer, Errett Bishop, Edmund Husserl and Alberto Quadrio Curzio.

== Key books ==
- Nonlinear and Multisectoral Macrodynamics: Essays in Honour of Richard Goodwin. (edited) Macmillan, London, 1989.
- Computable Economics (The Fourth Arne Ryde Lectures) Oxford University Press, January, 2000.
- Computable Foundations for Economics, Routledge, February, 2010. ISBN 978-0-415-35567-4
- The International Library of Critical Writings in Economics: The Elgar Companion to Computable Economics, Editor (with the assistance of: Stephen Kinsella & Stefano Zambelli), Edward Elgar, Cheltenham, November, 2011

== Main articles ==
- "Irving Fisher on `Switches of Techniques´: A Historical Note", Quarterly Journal of Economics, Vol. LXXXIX, No. 4, November, pp. 679–680, 1975.
- "Rationality, Computability and Complexity", (with B. Rustem), Journal of Economic Dynamics and Control, Vol. 14, No. 2, May, pp. 419–432, 1990.
- "The Vintage Economist", The Journal of Economic Behaviour and Organisation, Vol. 37, No.1, Sep., pp. 1–31, 1998.
- "Richard Goodwin: 1913-1996", The Economic Journal, Vol. 108, September, 1998, pp. 1436–1449.
- "Effectivity and Constructivity in Economic Theory", The Journal of Economic Behavior and Organization, Vol. 49, Issue, 3, pp. 307–325, November, 2002.
- Velupillai, K. V. (2005). "The unreasonable ineffectiveness of mathematics in economics". Cambridge Journal of Economics. 29 (6): 849. doi:10.1093/cje/bei084.
- Velupillai, K. Vela (2006). "Algorithmic foundations of computable general equilibrium theory". Applied Mathematics and Computation. 179: 360. doi:10.1016/j.amc.2005.11.113.
- Velupillai, K. Vela (2006). "A disequilibrium macrodynamic model of fluctuations". Journal of Macroeconomics. 28 (4): 752. doi:10.1016/j.jmacro.2004.10.002. hdl:10379/1107. S2CID 53694583.
- "Sraffa's Constructive Mathematical Economics", Journal of Economic Methodology, Vol. 15, No.4, December, pp. 325–348, 2008.
- "The Mathematization of Macroeconomics", Economia Politica [Journal of Analytical and Institutional Economics], Vol. XXV, Issue 3, August, pp. 283–316, 2008.
- "Uncomputability and Undecidability in Economic Theory", Applied Mathematics and Computation, Vol. 215, Issue 4, 15 October, pp. 1404–1416, 2009.
- "Variations on the Theme of Conning in Mathematical Economics", "Journal of Economic Surveys", Volume 21, Issue 3, 466–505, July 2007.
- "Development Economics without Growth Theory", Economia Politica[Journal of Analytical and Institutional Economics], Vol. XXVII, Issue 1,9-54, 2010.
- Velupillai, K. Vela (2011). "Towards an Algorithmic Revolution In Economic Theory". Journal of Economic Surveys. 25 (3): 401. doi:10.1111/j.1467-6419.2011.00684.x. S2CID 14601813.
- "The Phillips Machine and the Epistemology of Analogue Computation", Economia Politica [Journal of Analytical and Institutional Economics], Vol. XXVII, 39-62, Special Issue, 2011.
- Ragupathy, Venkatachalam; Velupillai, Kumaraswamy Vela (2012). "Origins and Early Development of the Nonlinear Endogenous Mathematical Theory of the Business Cycle". Economia Politica. 29 (1): 45–80. doi:10.1428/36746.
- Velupillai, K. Vela (2012). "Taming the Incomputable, Reconstructing the Nonconstructive and Deciding the Undecidable in Mathematical Economics" (PDF). New Mathematics and Natural Computation. 08: 5. doi:10.1142/S1793005712400017. S2CID 53341157.
- Kao, Ying-Fang; Ragupathy, V.; Velupillai, K. Vela; Zambelli, Stefano (2012). "Noncomputability, unpredictability, undecidability, and unsolvability in economic and finance theories" (PDF). Complexity. 18 (1): 51. Bibcode:2012Cmplx..18a..51K. doi:10.1002/cplx.21410.
- Velupillai, K. V. (2013). "Towards a political economy of the theory of economic policy". Cambridge Journal of Economics. 38 (6): 1329. doi:10.1093/cje/bet059.
- Velupillai, K.Vela; Kao, Ying-Fang (2014). "Computable and computational complexity theoretic bases for Herbert Simon's cognitive behavioral economics". Cognitive Systems Research. 29–30: 40. doi:10.1016/j.cogsys.2013.07.005. S2CID 11906572.
- Kao, Ying-Fang; Velupillai, K. Vela (2013). "Behavioural economics: Classical and modern". The European Journal of the History of Economic Thought. 22 (2): 236. doi:10.1080/09672567.2013.792366. S2CID 45718887.
- Vela Velupillai, K. (2014). "Constructive and computable Hahn–Banach theorems for the (second) fundamental theorem of welfare economics". Journal of Mathematical Economics. 54: 36. doi:10.1016/j.jmateco.2014.08.004.
- Velupillai, K. Vela (2013). "Negishi's Theorem and Method: Computable and Constructive Considerations". Computational Economics. 45 (2): 183. doi:10.1007/s10614-013-9416-5. S2CID 121283474.
- Velupillai, K. Vela (2015). "Iteration, tâtonnement, computation and economic dynamics". Cambridge Journal of Economics. 39 (6): 1551. doi:10.1093/cje/bev051.
- Vela Velupillai, K. (2016). "Seven Kinds of Computable and Constructive Infelicities in Economics". New Mathematics and Natural Computation. 12 (3): 219. doi:10.1142/S1793005716500150.

== International Awards, Fellowships, Memberships & Prizes ==
- Elected Member, Turing Centenary Advisory Committee (TCAC), December, 2010
- Elected to give the Herbert Simon Lectures at the National Chengchi University, Taipei, Taiwan, March, 2010.
- Elected to give the Krishna Bharadwaj Lecture, Jawaharlal Nehru University, New Delhi, India, March, 2010.
- Elected Foreign Member, Moral Sciences Division of the Juridical, Political and Economic Sciences, Istituto Lombardo, Italy, July, 2010.
- Awarded the '2009 Nord-Sud Fondazione Pescarabbruzzo Prize' for the Social Sciences, Fondazione Pescarabbruzzo, Pescara, Italy, October, 2009.
- Elected Foreign Corresponding Member of the Brazilian Academy of Philosophy, 17 April 2006.
- Elected to give the Laudatio Lecture in Honour of Richard Day, Max Planck Institute, Jena, May, 2008.
- Elected to a Visiting Fellowship, Peterhouse, Cambridge, 2001.
- Honorary Professor, Queen's University of Belfast, Belfast, UK, 1998-2003.
- Standing Senior Visiting Professor, Madras School of Economics, Chennai, India, 1998 --.
- Distinguished Invited Lecturer, Central Bank of Uruguay, Montevideo, Uruguay, 1998.
- Elected to give the Arne Ryde Lectures, University of Lund, Sweden, 1994.
- US National Science Foundation/Ford Foundation Visiting Professorship at the People's University, Beijing, China, 1988.
- C.O.R.E, Research Fellowship, Université catholique de Louvain, Louvain-La-Neuve, Belgium, 1977/78.

== Distinguished students ==
- Stefano Zambelli
- Shu-Heng Chen
- Francesco Luna
- Serena Sordi
- Stephen Kinsella
- Navaneethakrishnan Dharmaraj
- Venkatachalam Ragupathy
- Ying-Fang Kao (Selda Kao)
- Ilker Aslantepe
- Isabella Weber
- Rocío Palacios
- Alejandro Lopez-Feldman
