= Rafael E. Núñez =

American mathematician

Rafael E. Núñez is a professor of cognitive science at the University of California, San Diego and a proponent of embodied cognition. He co-authored Where Mathematics Comes From with George Lakoff.
