= Raymond Louis Wilder =

American mathematician

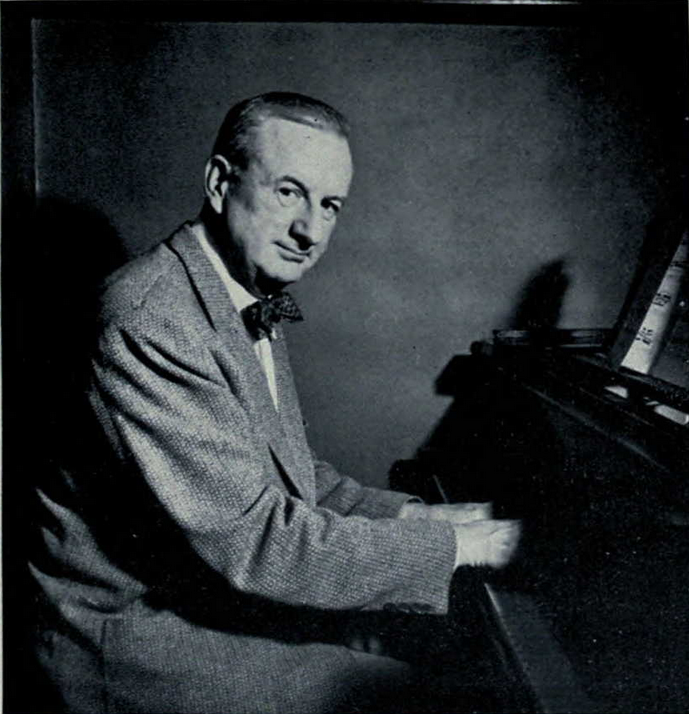
Raymond Louis Wilder, c. 1955

Raymond Louis Wilder (3 November 1896, Palmer, Massachusetts – 7 July 1982, Santa Barbara, California) was an American mathematician, who specialized in topology and gradually acquired philosophical and anthropological interests.

== Life ==
Wilder's father was a printer. Raymond was musically inclined. He played cornet in the family orchestra, which performed at dances and fairs, and accompanied silent films on the piano.

He entered Brown University in 1914, intending to become an actuary. During World War I, he served in the U.S. Navy as an ensign. Brown awarded him his first degree in 1920, and a master's degree in actuarial mathematics in 1921. That year, he married Una Maude Greene; they had four children, thanks to whom they have ample descent.

Wilder chose to do his Ph.D. at the University of Texas at Austin, the most fateful decision of his life. At Texas, Wilder discovered pure mathematics and topology, thanks to the remarkable influence of Robert Lee Moore, the founder of topology in the US and the inventor of the Moore method for teaching mathematical proof. Moore was initially unimpressed by the young actuary, but Wilder went on to solve a difficult open problem that Moore had posed to his class. Moore suggested Wilder write up the solution for his Ph.D. thesis, which he did in 1923, titling it Concerning Continuous Curves. Wilder thus became the first of Moore's many doctoral students at the University of Texas.

After a year as an instructor at Texas, Wilder was appointed assistant professor at the Ohio State University in 1924. That university required that its academic employees sign a loyalty oath, which Wilder was very reluctant to sign because doing so was inconsistent with his lifelong progressive political and moral views.

In 1926, Wilder joined the faculty of the University of Michigan at Ann Arbor, where he supervised 26 Ph.Ds and became a research professor in 1947. During the 1930s, he helped settle European refugee mathematicians in the United States. Mathematicians who rubbed shoulders with Wilder at Michigan and who later proved prominent included Samuel Eilenberg, the cofounder of category theory, and the topologist Norman Steenrod. After his 1967 retirement from Michigan at the rather advanced age of 71, Wilder became a research associate and occasional lecturer at the University of California at Santa Barbara.

Wilder was vice president of the American Mathematical Society, 1950–1951, president 1955–1956, and the Society's Josiah Willard Gibbs Lecturer in 1969. He was president of the Mathematical Association of America, 1965–1966, which awarded him its Distinguished Service Medal in 1973. He was elected to the American National Academy of Sciences in 1963. Brown University (1958) and the University of Michigan (1980) awarded him honorary doctorates. The mathematics department at the University of California annually bestows one or more graduating seniors with an award in Wilder's name.

The historical, philosophical, and anthropological writings of Wilder's later years suggest a warm, colorful personality. Raymond (2003) attests to this having been the case. For instance:

"[Wilder] was a devoted student of southwestern Native American culture. One day he told me that after retiring he would like to be a bartender in a rural area of Arizona or New Mexico, because he found the stories of the folk he met in bars there so fascinating."

== Topologist ==
Wilder's thesis set out a new approach to the Schönflies programme, which aimed to study positional invariants of sets in the plane or 2-sphere. A positional invariant of a set A with respect to a set B is a property shared by all homeomorphic images of A contained in B. The best known example of such a positional invariant is embodied in the Jordan curve theorem: A simple closed curve in the 2-sphere has precisely two complementary domains and is the boundary of each of them. A converse to the Jordan curve theorem, proved by Schönflies, states that a subset of the 2-sphere is a simple closed curve if it:

- Has two complementary domains;
- Is the boundary of each of these domains;
- Is accessible from each of these domains.

In his "A converse of the Jordan-Brouwer separation theorem in three dimensions" (1930), Wilder showed that a subset of Euclidean 3-space whose complementary domains satisfied certain homology conditions was a 2-sphere.

Around 1930, Wilder moved from set-theoretic topology to algebraic topology, calling in 1932 for the unification of the two areas. He then began an extensive investigation of the theory of manifolds, e.g., his "Generalized closed manifolds in n-space" (1934), in effect extending the Schönflies programme to higher dimensions. This work culminated in his Topology of Manifolds (1949), twice reprinted, whose last three chapters discuss his contributions to the theory of positional topological invariants.

== Philosopher ==
During the 1940s, Wilder met and befriended the University of Michigan anthropologist Leslie White, whose professional curiosity included mathematics as a human activity (White 1947). This encounter proved fateful, and Wilder's research interests underwent a major change, towards the foundations of mathematics. This change was foreshadowed by his 1944 article "The nature of mathematical proof," and heralded by his address to the 1950 International Congress of Mathematicians, titled "The cultural basis of mathematics," which posed the questions:

- "How does culture (in its broadest sense) determine a mathematical structure, such as a logic?"
- "How does culture influence the successive stages of the discovery of a mathematical structure?"

In 1952, he wrote up his course on foundations and the philosophy of mathematics into a widely cited text, Introduction to the foundations of mathematics.

Wilder's Evolution of mathematical concepts. An elementary study (1969) proposed that "we study mathematics as a human artifact, as a natural phenomenon subject to empirical observation and scientific analysis, and, in particular, as a cultural phenomenon understandable in anthropological terms." In this book, Wilder wrote:

"The major difference between mathematics and the other sciences, natural and social, is that whereas the latter are directly restricted in their purview by environmental phenomena of a physical or social nature, mathematics is subject only indirectly to such limitations. ... Plato conceived of an ideal universe in which resided perfect models ... the only reality mathematical concepts have is as cultural elements or artifacts."

Wilder's last book, Mathematics as a cultural system (1981), contained yet more thinking in this anthropological and evolutionary vein.

Wilder's eclectic and humanist perspective on mathematics appears to have had little influence on subsequent mathematical research. It has, however, had some influence on the teaching of mathematics and on the history and philosophy of mathematics. In particular, Wilder can be seen as a precursor to the work of Howard Eves, Evert Willem Beth, and Davis and Hersh (1981). Wilder's call for mathematics to be scrutinized by the methods of social science anticipates some aspects of Where Mathematics Comes From, by George Lakoff and Rafael Nunez. For an introduction to the limited anthropological research on mathematics, see the last chapter of Hersh (1997).

== Bibliography ==
Books by Wilder:

- 1949. Topology of Manifolds.
- 1965 (1952). Introduction to the foundations of mathematics.
- 1969. Evolution of mathematical concepts. An elementary study.
- 1981. Mathematics as a cultural system. (ISBN 0-08-025796-8)

Biographical:

- Raymond, F., 2003, " Raymond Louis Wilder" in Biographical Memoirs National Academy of Sciences 82: 336–51.

Related work cited in this entry:

- Philip J. Davis and Reuben Hersh, 1981. The Mathematical Experience.
- Reuben Hersh, 1997. What Is Mathematics, Really? Oxford Univ. Press.
- Leslie White, 1947, "The Locus of Mathematical Reality: An Anthropological Footnote," Philosophy of Science 14: 289–303. Reprinted in Reuben Hersh, ed., 2006. 18 Unconventional Essays on the Nature of Mathematics. Springer: 304–19.
