= Mary-Elizabeth Hamstrom =

American mathematician

Mary-Elizabeth Hamstrom (May 24, 1927 – December 2, 2009) was an American mathematician known for her contributions to topology, and particularly to point-set topology and the theory of homeomorphism groups of manifolds. She was for many years a professor of mathematics at the University of Illinois at Urbana–Champaign.

== Early life and education ==
Hamstrom was born in Pittsburgh, one of three sisters. She frequently abbreviated her name as M-E, but never Mary. She was a student at Germantown High School (Philadelphia), where Anna Mullikin, a mathematician and doctoral student of Robert Lee Moore, had become a teacher. She did her undergraduate studies at the University of Pennsylvania, where Moore had taught many years previously, and completed her bachelor's degree there in mathematics in 1948, after having worked there as an assistant to John Robert Kline, who had been another of Moore's students at the University of Pennsylvania before becoming a faculty member there himself.

Given this background, "she seemed predestined to pursue graduate work with Robert Lee Moore at the University of Texas", as on Kline's recommendation she did. A letter from Moore to Hamstrom, while she was still a senior at the University of Pennsylvania, describes the Moore method of teaching mathematics and expresses Moore's regret that she had already begun study in her intended specialty; Moore preferred to begin with a clean slate. This letter has been described as being "of considerable importance in the history of mathematics education".

Hamstrom completed her Ph.D. at the University of Texas at Austin in 1952. Her dissertation, under Moore's supervision, was Concerning Webs in the Plane. F. Burton Jones, another Moore student on the Texas faculty, became another of her mentors.

== Career and later life ==
On completing her doctorate, Hamstrom became a faculty member at Goucher College, then a women's college, and she earned tenure there in 1957 after a year at the Institute for Advanced Study. While visiting the institute, she was encouraged to move to the University of Illinois at Urbana–Champaign by Paul T. Bateman, who was a professor there and was also visiting the Institute at the same time. Hamstrom had known Bateman from the University of Pennsylvania, where he was a graduate student when she was an undergraduate. Following Bateman's advice, she moved to the University of Illinois in 1961. Five years later, when the university promoted her to full professor, she became only one of four women with that rank in the College of Liberal Arts and Sciences. She retired in 1999.

Hamstrom's "period of greatest creative activity" was from 1950 to 1980, during which she published 24 papers on point set topology, geometric topology, and the homeomorphisms of manifolds, and supervised eight doctoral students. (A ninth student completed a doctorate in 1999, the year of Hamstrom's retirement.)
