= 2024 University of Texas at Austin pro-Palestinian campus protests =

Starting on April 24, 2024

- Part of Gaza war protests (in the US • at universities (in 2024 (in the US)))
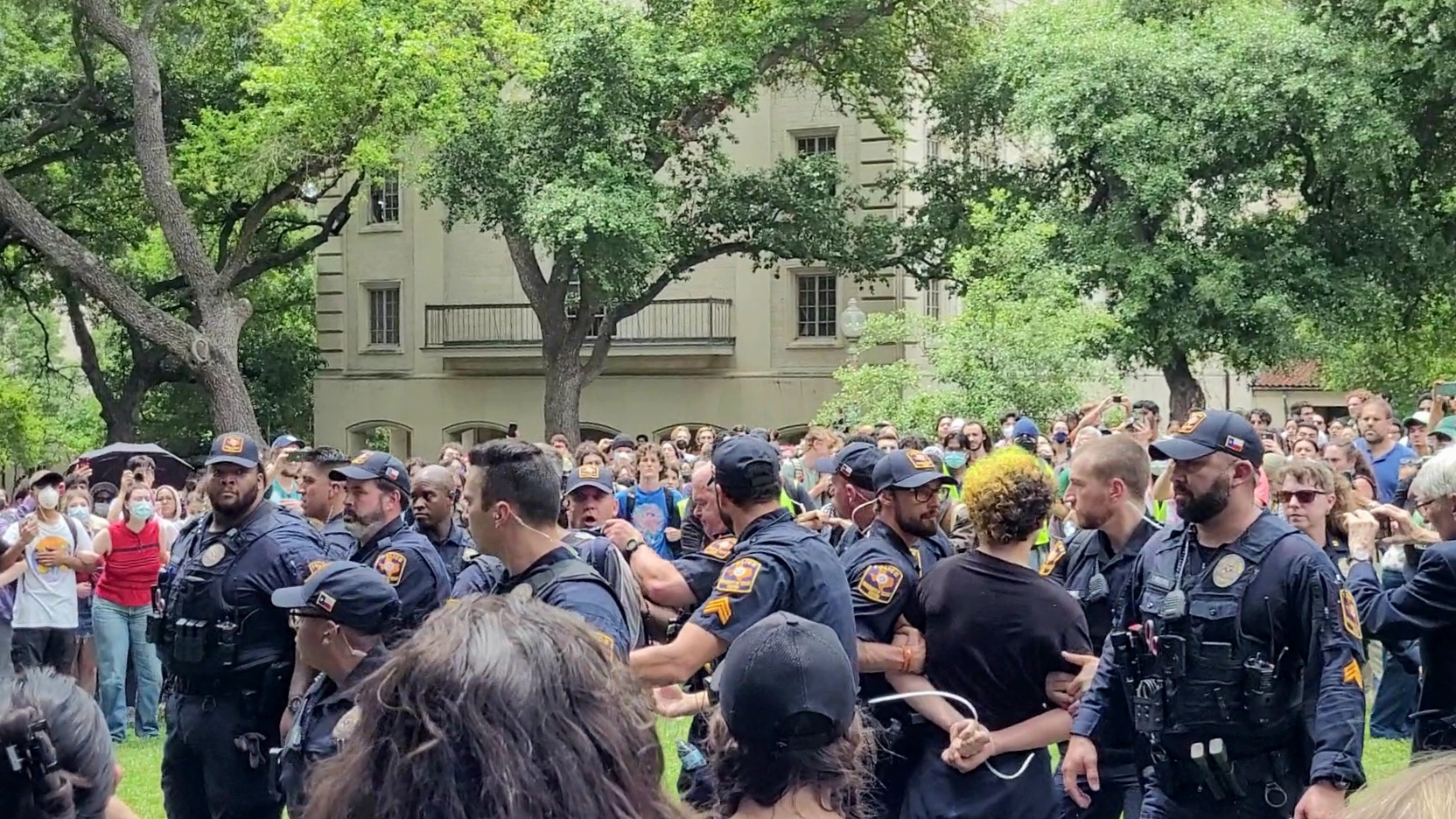
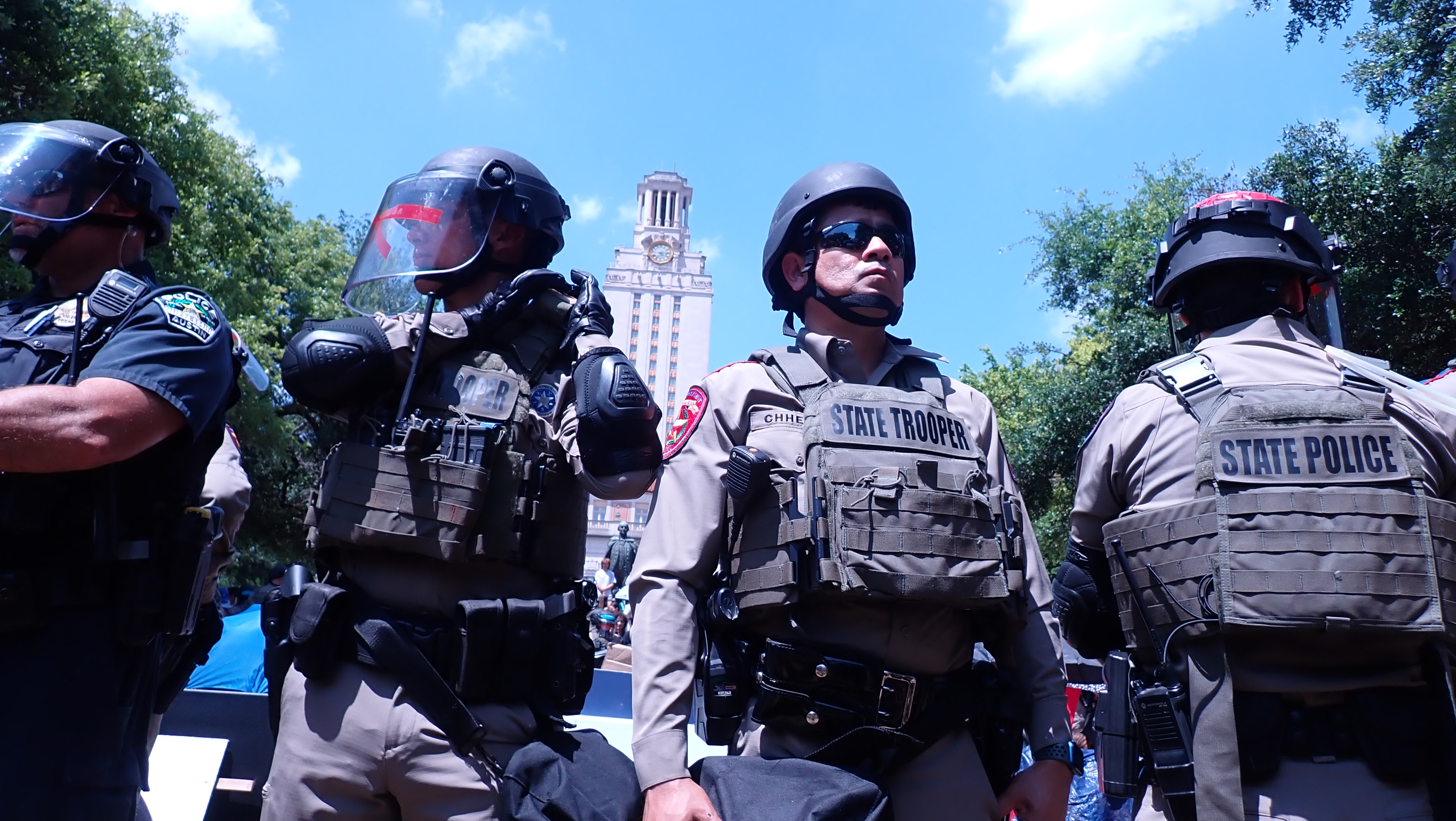
- Clockwise from top: Police take a defensive formation with multiple protesters zip-tied at the April 24th protest.; Police units separating observers from protestors on the main lawn of the University of Texas at Austin. The Texas State Capitol can be seen in the distance.; Riot police on the main lawn. The UT Tower can be seen in the background.
- Date: April 24, 2024 – Present
- Location: University of Texas at Austin, Austin, Texas, United States; 30.283°N 97.732°W
- Methods: Sit-in; Civil disobedience; Marching

Lead figures
| Palestine Solidarity Committee organizers | President Hartzell; Governor Abbott |

Casualties
- Arrested: 57

Pro-Palestinian protests at the University of Texas at Austin (UT Austin) began on April 24, 2024, organized by the Palestinian Solidarity Committee in response to the ongoing Gaza war. The protests have included sit-ins, marches, and encampments on campus, calling for the university to divest from companies linked to Israel's actions in Gaza. The demonstrations escalated when university officials, with support from local and state law enforcement, intervened to disperse protestors, leading to multiple arrests and sparking criticism over the suppression of free speech on campus. Despite arrests and clashes with police, the protests have continued, drawing significant attention and raising debates about civil liberties and the role of university administration in managing campus protests.

== Background ==
By May 6, 2024, student protests had occurred in 45 of the 50 states in the United States and the District of Columbia, with encampments, occupations, walkouts or sit-ins on almost 140 campuses. Thirty-four encampments were established in the United Kingdom; across universities in Australia, beginning with the University of Sydney; and in Canada, including an encampment at McGill University. On May 7, protests spread further on European campuses after mass arrests at the University of Amsterdam campus occupation, including occupation of campus buildings at Leipzig University in Germany, Sciences Po in France, and Ghent University in Belgium. By May 8, protests had taken place in more than 25 countries, and on May 13, approximately 1,000 Dutch students and university staff took part in a national walk-out.

== Early protests and controversies (October 2023 - April 2024) ==
Controversy relating to the pro-Palestine movement began at the University of Texas at Austin almost immediately after the October 7 attacks. The University quickly increased security around Jewish organizations in the West Campus neighborhood, where a mural near the Texas Hillel had been vandalized by graffiti, fueling fears of antisemitic activity. The Hillel was further vandalized by graffiti reading "Free Palestine" in March.

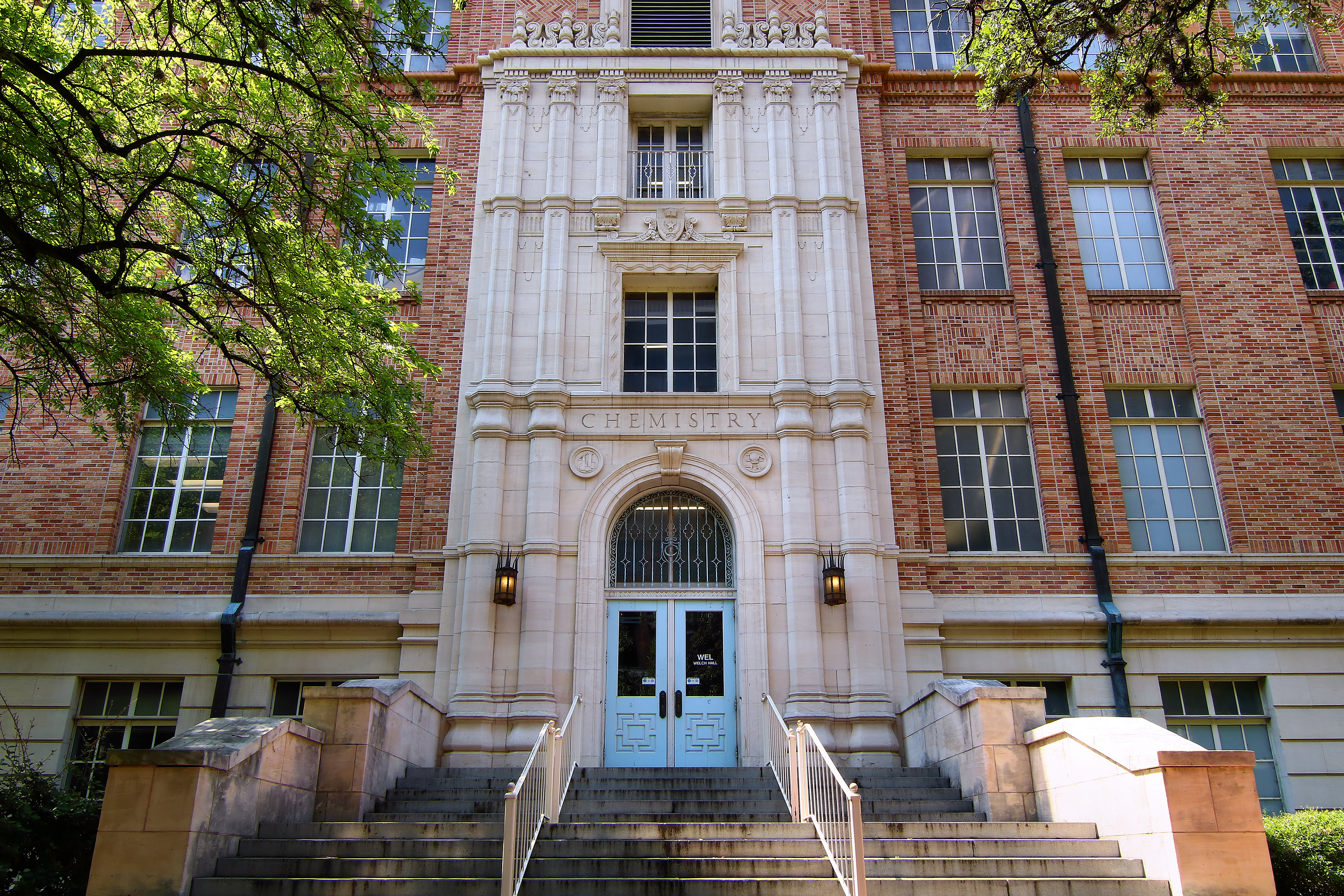
Welch Hall (pictured in 2024), where three men verbally harassed and tried to disrupt a Palestine Solidarity Committee meeting

On October 12, three men attempted to disrupt an educational event at Welch Hall held by the university's chapter of the Palestine Solidarity Committee (PSC), having previously sent a threatening message to the organization's Instagram page. The three men verbally attacked the organizers as "terrorists," with one claiming he would be "killing Arabs" in Israel the next week, and were prevented by a PSC organizer from entering the lecture hall where the event was taking place. The men, one of whom claiming he was a member of the Israel Defense Forces, left after about three minutes. An investigation by the University of Texas at Austin Police Department was launched, but did not find that any criminal offense had occurred. The following day, university president Jay Hartzell released a statement decrying "violence" and "vandalism," but did not mention either the incident at Welch Hall nor the Israeli-Palestinian conflict by name. Hartzell's address was criticized by Arab and Muslim students as ignoring their concerns as having "marginalized" Palestinian students. Hartzell released a second statement on October 17 more explicitly condemning both antisemitism and Anti-Arab racism and criticized Hamas.

PSC organized a November 9 walkout of over 1,000 people calling for divestment from weapon manufacturing companies and the release of a statement on Gaza, followed by an educational "takeover" of Speedway, a campus walkway, on November 15. The takeover, cohosted by the Muslim Student Association, mostly consisted of handing out flyers about Palestine. The Texas Hillel criticized the walkout for coinciding with the anniversary of Kristallnacht, and advised members to avoid the event.

Further controversy ensued later in the month with the removal of two teaching assistants, Callie Kennedy and Parham Daghighi, who at the behest of a student had crafted a letter with professor Lauren Gulbas recommending mental health services in relation to the conflict and criticizing the university's silence on the humanitarian crisis in Gaza. Soon after, Kennedy and Paghiga received a letter from dean Allen Cole dismissing them as teaching assistants, citing their "unprompted" and "inappropriate" message. Their dismissal prompted further protests. On December 8, students entered Cole's office to read out and hand deliver a list of demands. Cole, who was making funeral arrangements for his father over the phone at the time, did not respond and left the room. Four of the students were sanctioned and threatened with expulsion for two semesters, citing their entrance into a locked building and refusal to allow Cole to leave. A lawyer for the students accused the university of punishing a peaceful protest due to its pro-Palestinian nature. Conversely, university officials characterized the protest as "possible trespassing" and a "disruption." 111 faculty joined in calling for the reinstation of Kennedy and Daghighi in an open letter to Hartzell.

In early 2024, two separate assaults in West Campus escalated activists' demands that UT respond to anti-Palestinianism on campus and divest from weapons manufacturers. 7:00 pm, on February 3, 2024, Zacharia Doar, a Palestinian man from Dallas, was driving through West Campus with two other Palestinian friends, returning from a protest at the Texas state capitol. The three men had a keffiyeh reading "Free Palestine" on a flagpole attached to their truck. At the intersection of Nueces and 26th, passing cyclist Bert James Baker verbally assaulted the men and attempted to remove the flagpole. The men exited the truck to confront Baker, who punched Doar in the shoulders. In the ensuing scuffle, the men knocked Baker down repeatedly, until Baker rose with a knife in his hand and stabbed Doar, who wrestled Baker down and took his knife. Upon his arrest, Baker attributed the attack to his alcoholism. The Council on American-Islamic Relations decried the stabbing as a hate crime, which the Austin Police Department (APD) recommended it be prosecuted as. The recommendation was declined by a grand jury. Although the APD announced an increase in West Campus patrols, a second hate crime occurred on April 5, when a student in Muslim garb was attacked verbally and physically by three men near the Dobie Center. In response, six activist organizations released a statement calling for action from UT.

Responding to concerns over antisemitism and growing activism, Texas governor Greg Abbott, issued an executive order in late March which updated earlier campus speech protections to include a broader definition of antisemitism advocated by the International Holocaust Remembrance Alliance.

== Escalation (April 24–29) ==
=== First protest (April 24) ===
Police tackle and arrest a Fox 7 reporter at the April 24th protest.

On April 24, 2024, the Palestinian Solidarity Committee student group at the University of Texas at Austin initiated a walkout and sit-in on the South Mall of the campus to protest the Israel-Hamas War and demand that the university divest from companies profiting from Israel's actions.

In response to the protest and an "occupation" of the university, the university, under the explicit direction of President Hartzell, requested the assistance of the Austin Police Department (APD) and the Texas Department of Public Safety (DPS), in coordination with Governor of Texas Greg Abbott, to quell the demonstrations.

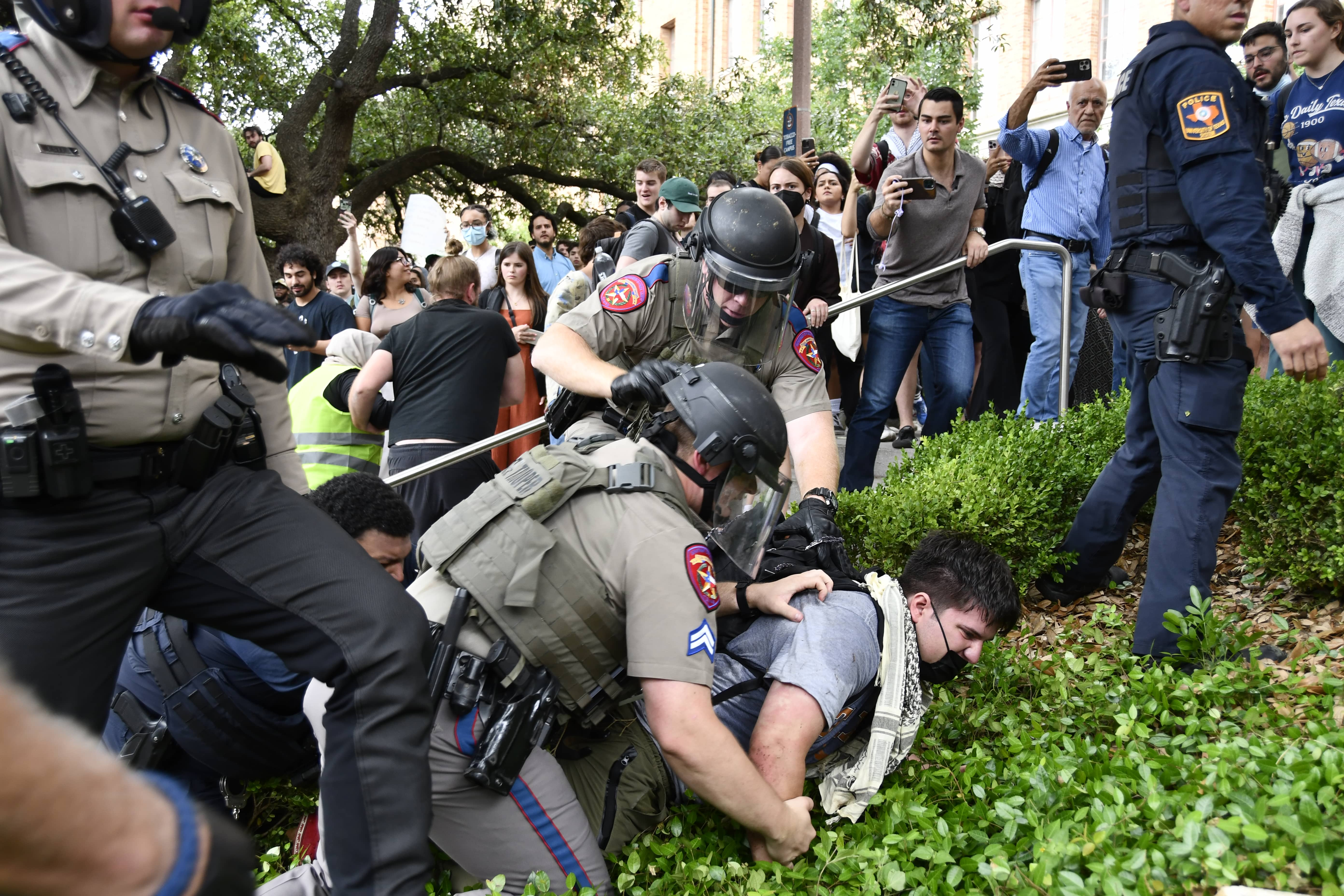
A protester is tackled by police and arrested at the pro-Palestinian protest on April 24, 2024, at the University of Texas at Austin.

At least 50 troops in riot gear were deployed to disperse protesters, with reports of police on horseback and carrying batons aggressively engaging with the demonstrators. This action led to the arrest of 57 protesters and several more detained, including a photojournalist who was reportedly being caught in a scuffle between law enforcement and students for Fox 7 Austin. Fox 7 Austin reposted the viral footage to Twitter, stating their employee was pushed by an officer into another before being thrown to the ground and arrested. Another Texas journalist was knocked down and seen bleeding before being handed off to emergency medical staff by police. The officers ended up leaving after a few hours and about 300 demonstrators moved back to sit and chant near the clock tower.

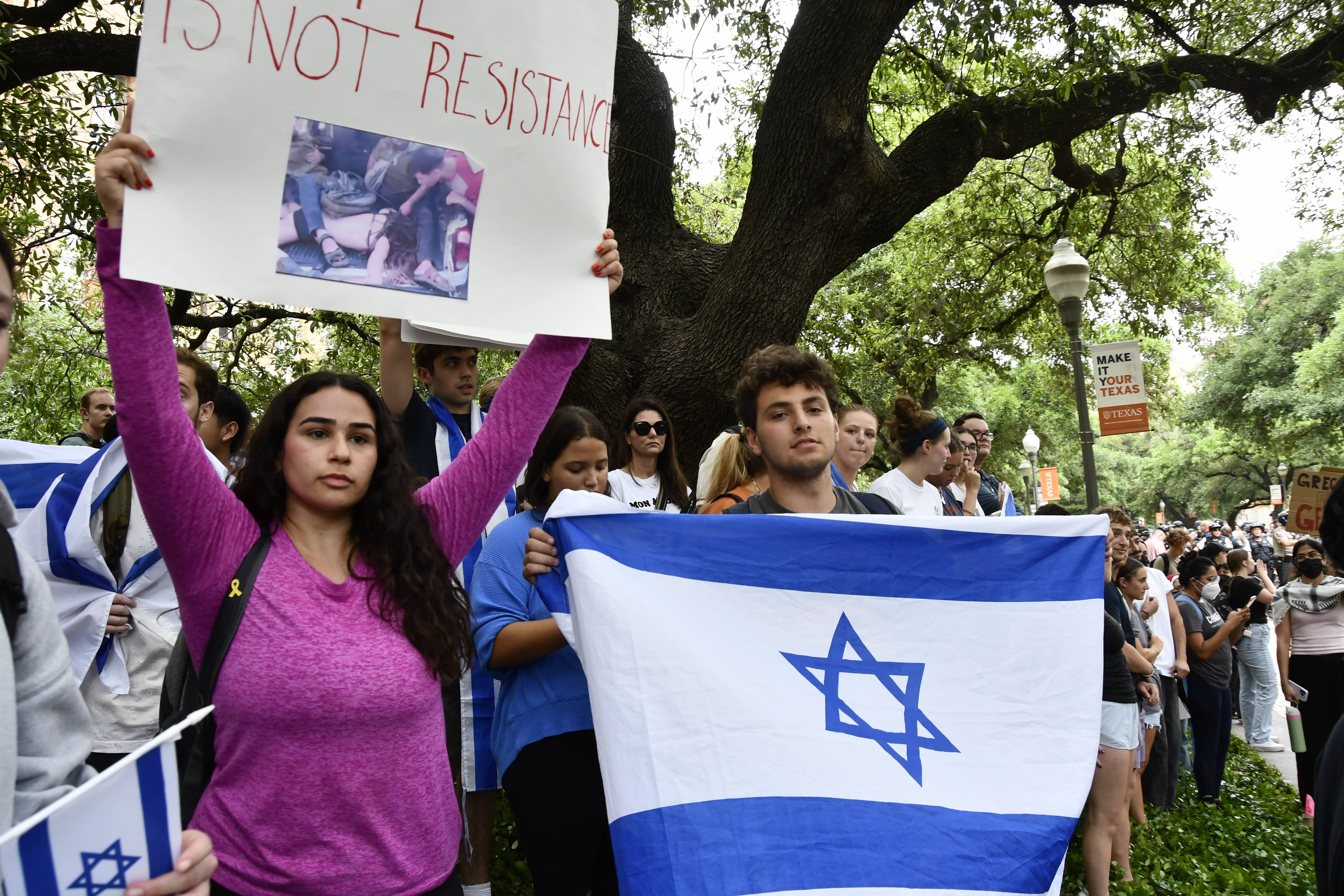
A group of pro-Israel counterprotesters demonstrate at the fringe of the much larger pro-Palestinian protest on April 24, 2024.

Following the arrests, a Travis County attorney stated, "It is not the role of the criminal justice system... to assist our governor in efforts to suppress nonviolent and peaceful demonstrations." Charges were dismissed against 46 protesters the next day, leading to their subsequent release. The remaining 11 protesters had their charges dropped on April 26, 2024.

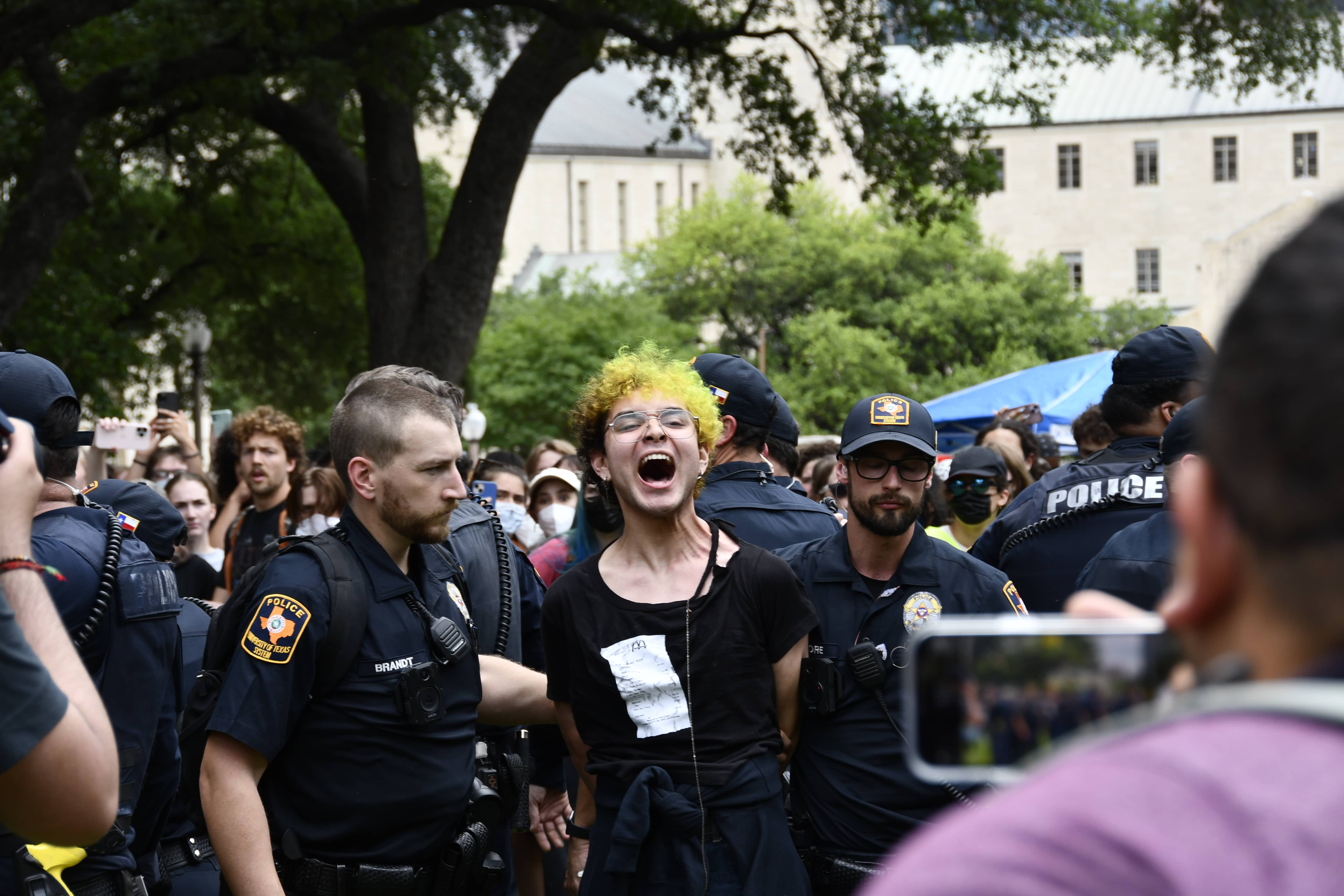
Police arrest a protester present at the April 24, 2024, pro-Palestinian protest on the South Lawn of the University of Texas at Austin.

The deployment of police forces and the arrests prompted criticism and raised concerns about free speech on campus, which had been praised by Abbott and the university in prior years. Texas Governor Greg Abbott stated that the UT Austin protesters "belong in jail", leading the Council on American-Islamic Relations to respond, "The First Amendment applies to the State of Texas, whether Greg Abbott likes it or not."

=== Immediate aftermath and further demonstrations (April 25–28) ===
On April 25, 2024, more than 1,000 students, faculty, and staff protested outside of the Main Building calling for President Hartzell's resignation, along with the local chapter of the American Association of University Professors circulating a petition for an official motion of no-confidence against him. Within 72 hours, more than 500 professors and instructors, around 13% of all faculty, had already signed the petition, including several department chairs, such as Diana Marculescu, and a dean for the College of Liberal Arts. On April 29, 2024, at 8:30 a.m. Central Daylight Time, the letter was formally delivered to President Hartzell, with 539 signatures, with the form remaining open for further signatures. A separate group of 165 faculty, including Steve Vladeck, also signed an open letter condemning President Hartzell's actions for quelling free speech and endangering the campus community.

=== Second protest (April 29) ===
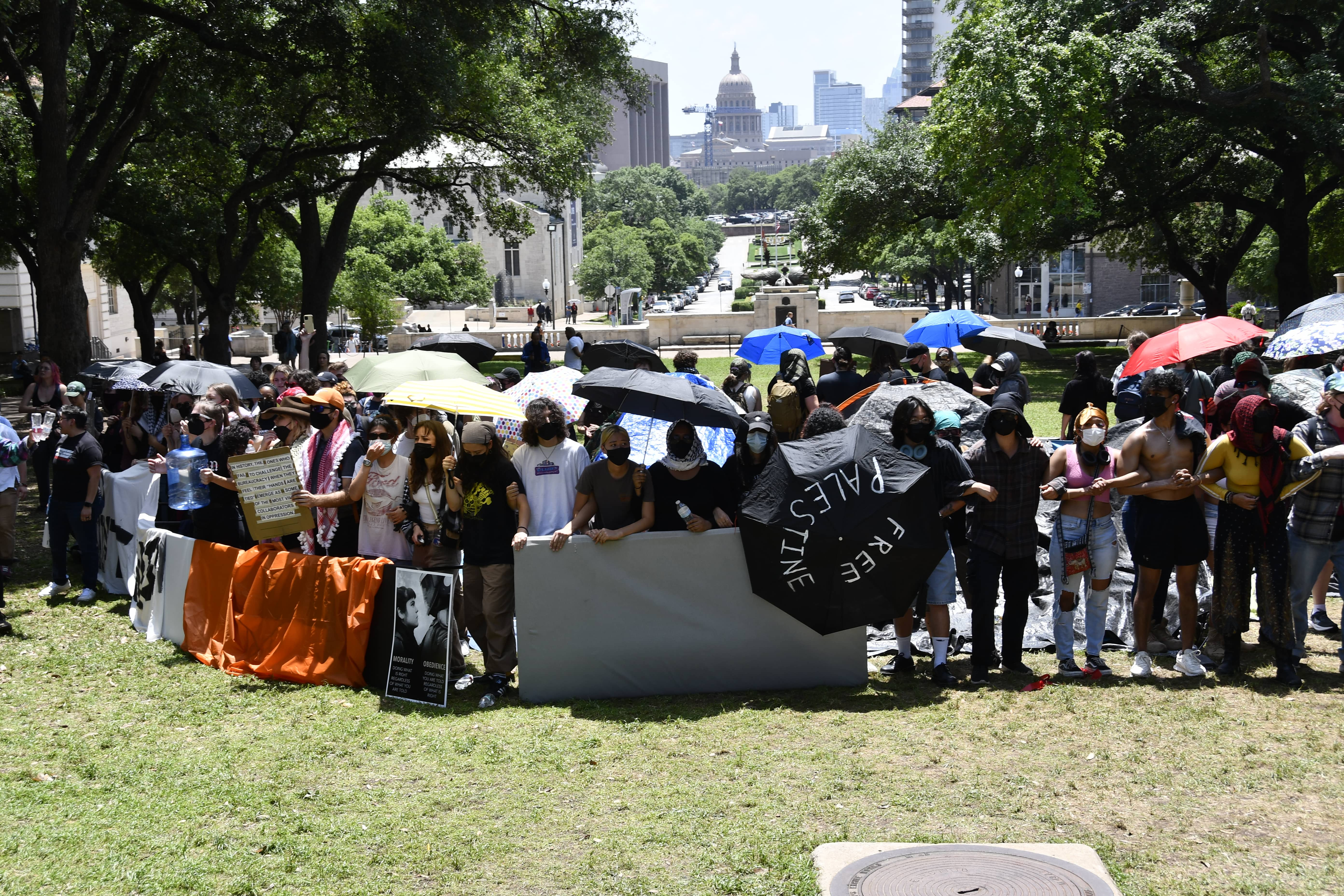
A group of pro-Palestinian protesters assemble into a makeshift encampment on the South Law of the University of Texas at Austin on April 29, 2024.

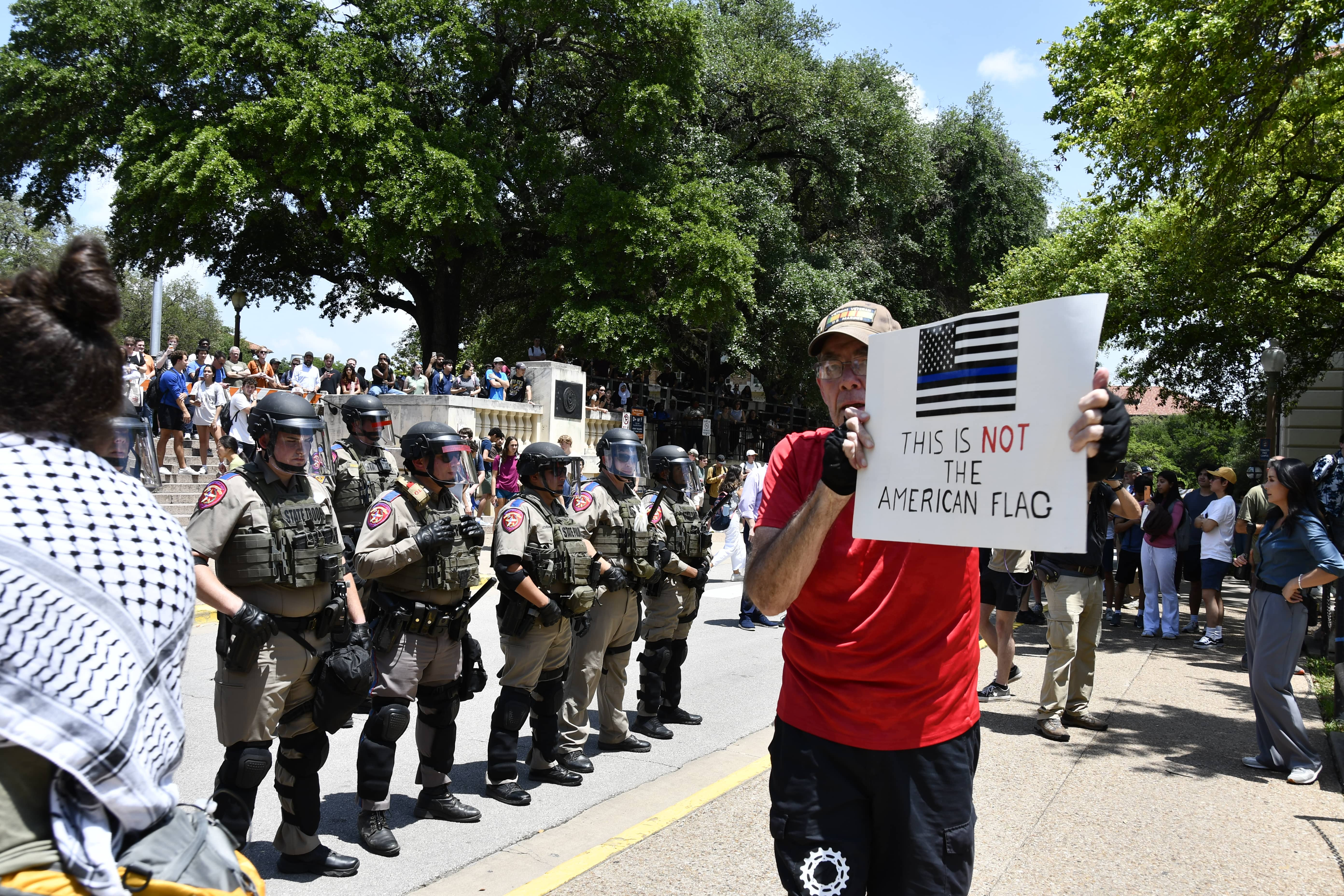
An older pro-Palestinian protester holds a sign with a Blue Lives Matter flag and the words "this is not the American flag" in front of a line of Texas State Troopers at a pro-Palestinian protest on the campus of the University of Texas at Austin on April 29, 2024.

On April 29, 2024, a surprise protest occurred where protestors set up tents on campus and refused to leave when confronted by UTPD. Subsequently, APD and Texas DPS officers arrived at the scene and surrounded the encampment, leading to its dismantling, and the arrest of several protestors. Several protestors then moved to confront the police to block their departure and further, leading to the usage of pepper spray and stun grenades by law enforcement. Additionally, several protestors had to receive medical attention due to the sweltering heat. In total, 79 protestors were arrested, with 78 criminal trespassing charges, one "obstructing a highway" charge, and one "interference of public duties" charge filed. This escalation drew further condemnation, above all for the usage of riot-dispersing tactics. Travis County Attorney Delia Garza further stated that the way that the university handled the protests put a strain on the local criminal justice system, specifically reprimanding the sending of protestors to jail for low-level charges.

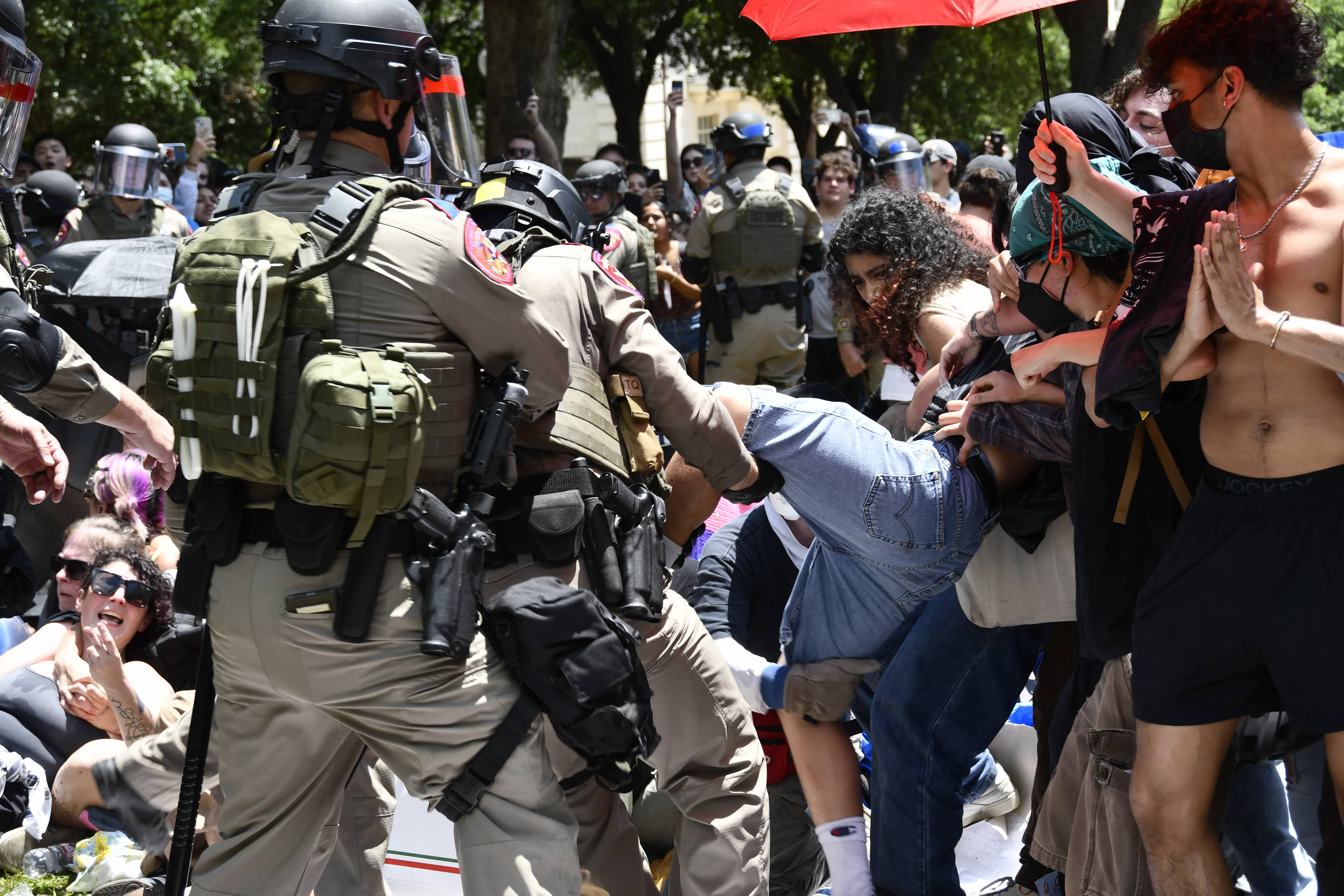
A protester, held by his arms and legs, is dragged out of a pro-Palestinian "encampment" on the South Lawn of the University of Texas at Austin on April 29, 2024.

== Lawsuit ==
A University of Texas at Austin student, Ammer Qaddumi, has filed a federal lawsuit against the university, President Jay Hartzell, and Provost Sharon Wood, alleging violations of his First Amendment rights after he was arrested during a protest against Israel’s actions in Gaza. Qaddumi, a senior at UT Austin, claims the university retaliated by threatening suspension and restricting his speech prior to the demonstration. The university has defended its actions, citing rule violations by the protesters, while Qaddumi's lawyer argues that the arrests and subsequent disciplinary actions, including Qaddumi's threatened three-semester suspension, were unjust and suppressed free speech.
