= Physics, Math, and Astronomy Building =

Building in the University of Texas at Austin

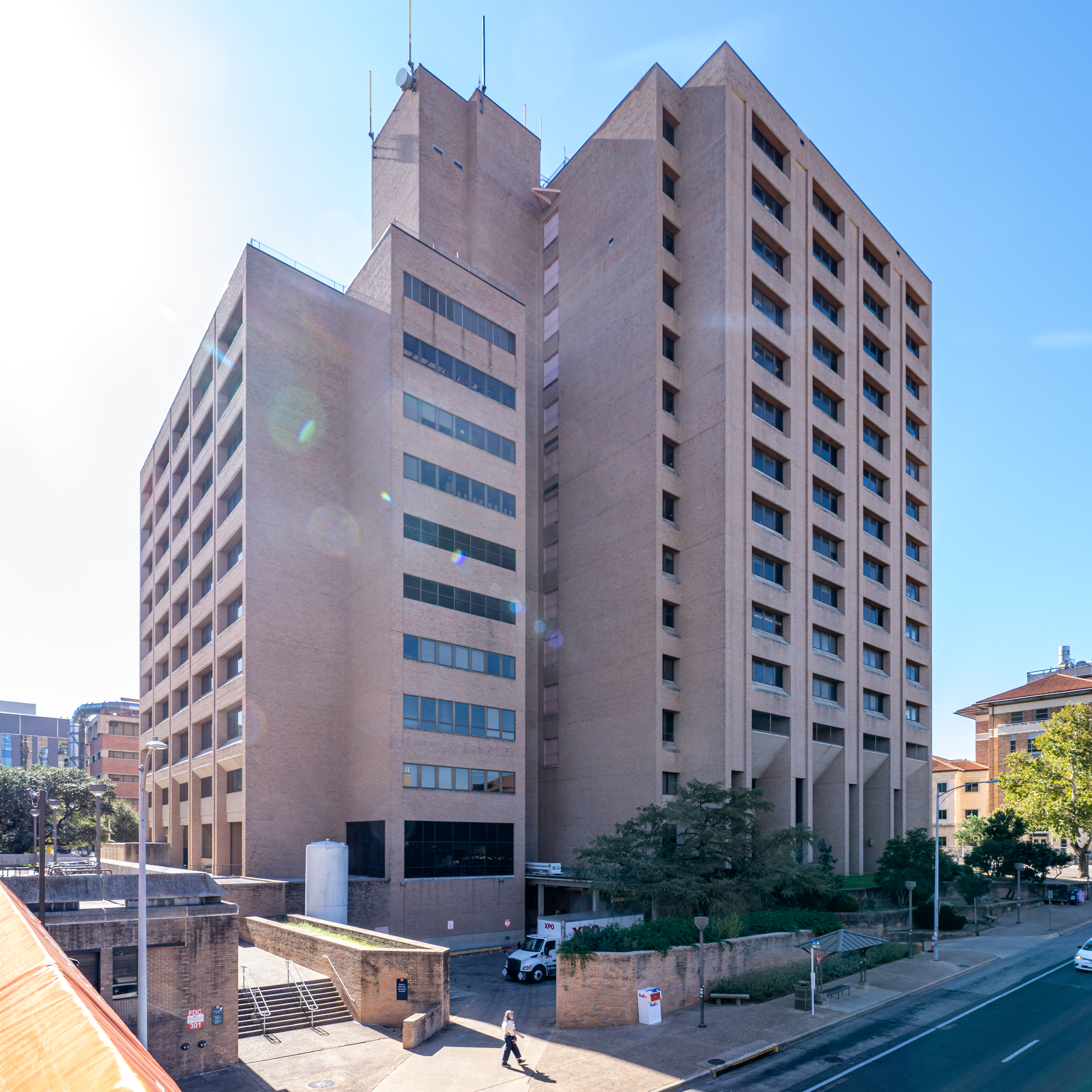
- The building's exterior in 2025
- Interactive map of the Physics, Math, and Astronomy Building area
- Former names: Robert Lee Moore Hall (1973–2020)
- Alternative names: PMA

General information
- Location: 2515 Speedway, Austin, Texas, United States
- Coordinates: 30.288963°N 97.736502°W

Technical details
- Floor count: 19
- Floor area: 384,215 sq ft (35,694.7 m^{2})

Physics, Math, and Astronomy Building (abbreviated PMA; formerly known as Robert Lee Moore Hall or RLM) is a high rise building on the University of Texas at Austin campus, in the U.S. state of Texas. The building was completed in 1972, and houses the astronomy, mathematics, and physics departments, as well as the Kuehne Physics Mathematics Astronomy Library.

The building was originally named Physics-Mathematics-Astronomy Building (PMA) but was renamed to Robert Lee Moore Hall in 1973, after mathematician Robert Lee Moore. In 2016, students demanded the building be renamed because of Moore's racist treatment of African American students. On July 13, 2020, during the George Floyd protests, University Interim President Jay Hartzell announced that the building would be renamed once again to the Physics, Math and Astronomy Building.
