= Jay Hartzell =

President of Southern Methodist University

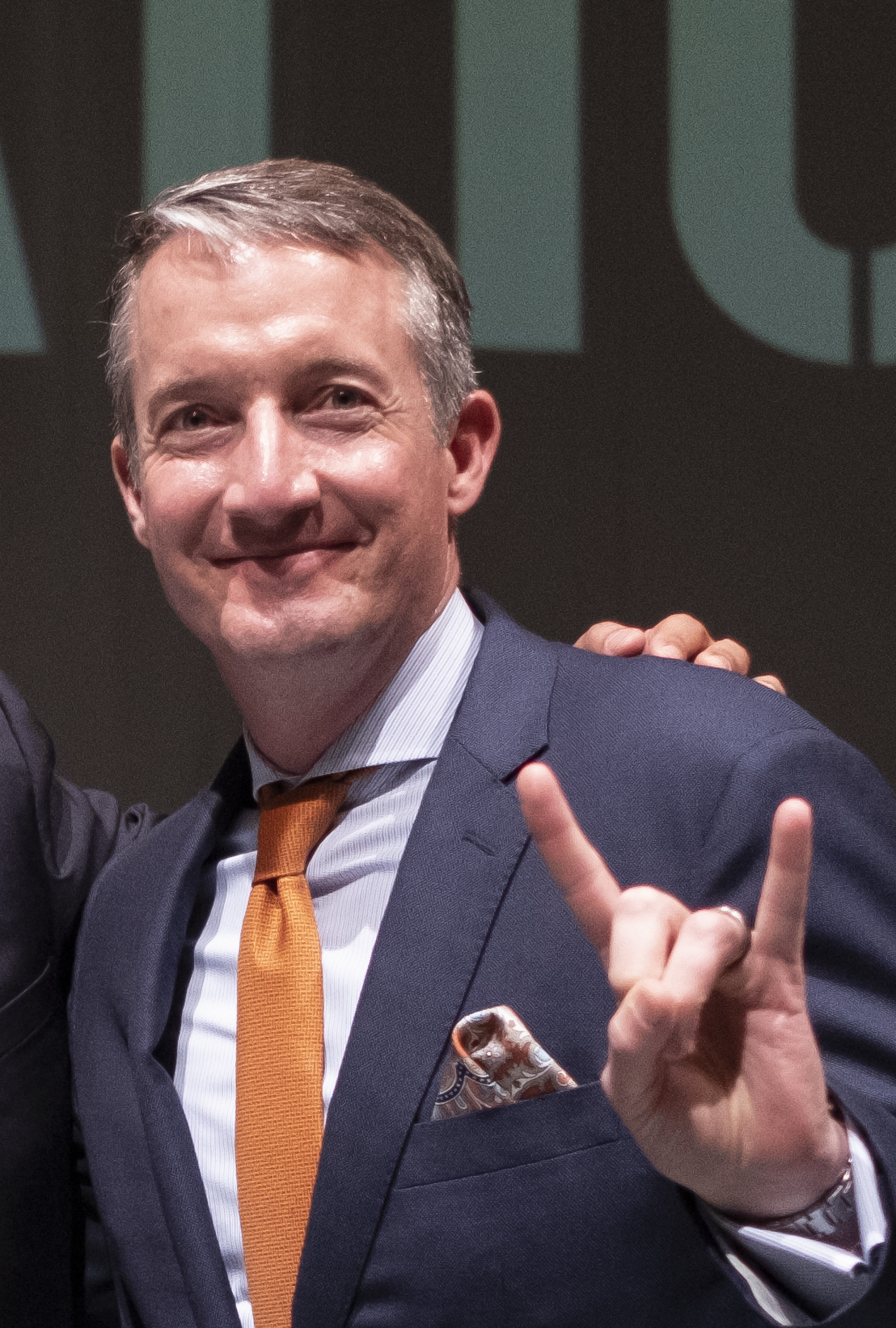
- Hartzell in 2019

President of Southern Methodist University
- Incumbent
- Assumed office June 1, 2025
- Preceded by: R. Gerald Turner

30th President of the University of Texas, Austin
- In office September 23, 2020 – February 19, 2025
- Preceded by: Gregory L. Fenves
- Succeeded by: Jim Davis

Personal details
- Born: Jay Carter Hartzell; September 1, 1969 (age 57) Kansas, U.S.
- Education: Trinity University (BS); University of Texas at Austin (MS, PhD)
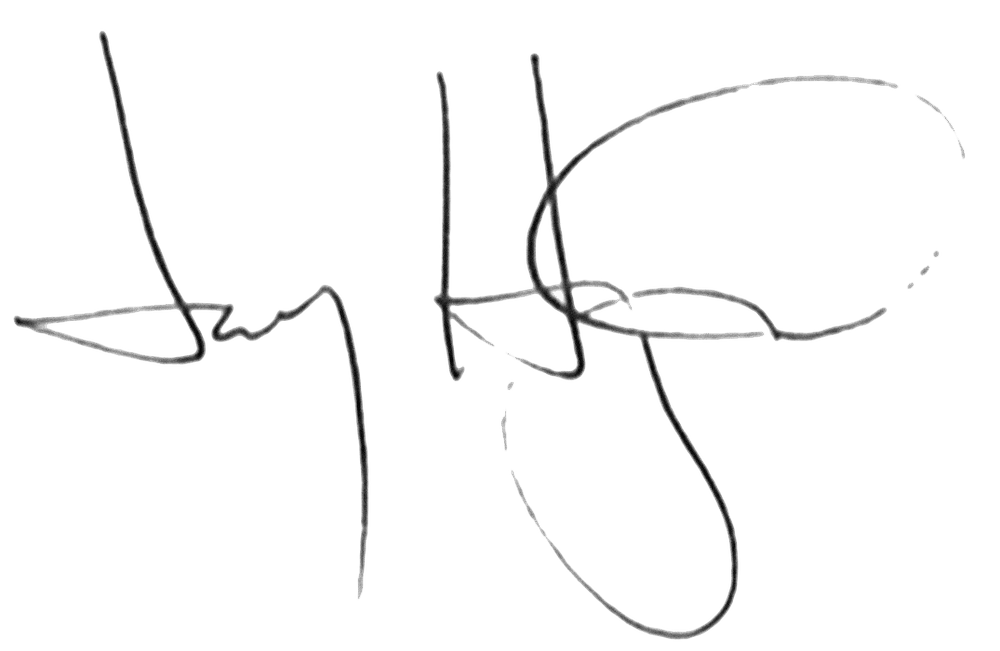
- Signature

Academic background
- Thesis: The Impact of the Likelihood of Turnover on Executive Compensation (1998)
- Doctoral advisor: Laura Stark

Academic work
- Discipline: Finance
- Institutions: New York University; University of Texas, Austin

Jay Carter Hartzell (born September 1, 1969) is an American economist, currently serving as the 11th president of Southern Methodist University. He was previously the 30th President of the University of Texas at Austin, holding office from 2020 to 2025.

== Early life and education ==
Hartzell was born in Kansas and grew up in Oklahoma. He graduated from Trinity University in San Antonio with honors with a B.S. in business administration and economics. After receiving a doctorate in finance from UT Austin, he served as a tenure-track assistant professor of finance at New York University's Stern School of Business between 1998 and 2001.

== University of Texas at Austin ==
In 2001, Hartzell returned to UT Austin as a faculty member in the McCombs School of Business. Since then, he has served in various capacities, including as the senior associate dean for academic affairs, the executive director of the business school's Real Estate Finance and Investment Center, and as the chair of UT Austin's finance department. In 2016, he was named dean of the McCombs School of Business. As dean, Hartzell launched the Goff Real Estate Labs, elevated the Canfield Business Honors program and opened Rowling Hall, the home of UT Austin's MBA program. He helped create many significant partnerships with colleges and schools across campus including the Dell Medical School, the College of Fine Arts, the College of Liberal Arts, the College of Natural Sciences and the Moody College of Communication. He established the position of Associate Dean of Diversity and Inclusion at the McCombs School and the McCombs Diversity and Inclusion Committee. He also established McCombs’ one-year Master of Science in Finance degree, created the Undergraduate Real Estate Certificate Program and oversaw the completion of the fundraising, construction and opening of Rowling Hall, a 500,000-square-foot graduate business facility.

In April 2020, the University of Texas System's Board of Regents appointed Hartzell to serve as interim president of UT Austin. In July 2020, in response to concerns raised by student athletes, alumni and other UT Austin community members, Hartzell announced a series of measures designed to create a more diverse and welcoming campus at UT Austin. The measures included: working with a group of students, faculty members, staffers and alumni to allocate a multimillion-dollar investment from Athletics’ revenue to UT Austin programs to recruit, attract, retain and support Black students; renaming the Robert L. Moore Building as the Physics, Math and Astronomy Building; honoring Heman M. Sweatt, UT Austin's first Black student, in a variety of ways on campus; commissioning a new monument for the Precursors, the first Black undergraduates to attend UT Austin; erecting a statue for Julius Whittier, UT Austin's first Black football player; and renaming Joe Jamail Field for Heisman Trophy winners Earl Campbell and Ricky Williams. He has at the same time also received criticism from Black lawmakers and UT students concerning his defence of the song "Eyes of Texas" although considered a racist tradition of the university by some.

Throughout the summer of 2020, Hartzell led UT Austin's response to the COVID-19 crisis, and on August 13, 2020, the UT System Board of Regents announced Hartzell as the sole finalist for the position of UT Austin president. On September 23, 2020, the UT System Board of Regents unanimously voted to name Hartzell the 30th president of UT Austin, effective immediately.

On April 2, 2024, Hartzell announced additional adjustments in compliance with Senate Bill 17, particularly in response to a March 26 letter from Texas State Senator Brandon Creighton, which led to the layoff of approximately 60 individuals, most of whom formerly worked in DEI-related programs, and the elimination of the newly renamed Division of Campus and Community Engagement. Critics denounced the university's over-compliance with the anti-DEI law, since the university had already been compliant since January 1, 2024. This decision led to on-campus protests and a petition from over 500 concerned parties calling for additional transparency, along with requesting a town hall, to which Hartzell did not respond. At a UT Austin Faculty Council meeting on April 15, in response to mounting criticism, Hartzell stated the additional changes were made in response to threats from the Republican-led State Legislature and the University of Texas System Board of Regents, and to restore "confidence" in the university, reacting to changing tides in public opinion towards higher education amongst Republicans.

On April 24, 2024, the university, under Hartzell's explicit directive, requested the assistance of the Austin Police Department and the Texas Department of Public Safety, in coordination with Texas Governor Greg Abbott, in an attempt to quell large student-led pro-Palestinian protests and an "occupation" of the university, in contrast to free speech on campus laws praised by Abbott and the university in prior years. The decision and subsequent statements received sharp backlash from faculty, staff, students, several Democratic legislators for the region, and First Amendment advocacy groups, including an official statement from the UT Faculty Council Executive Committee denouncing it, in part due to the extreme, chaotic, and violent police response that ensued and alleged violations of First Amendment rights. A total of 57 protesters were arrested, including a photojournalist for Fox 7 Austin, with several more detained. Charges were dismissed against 46 protesters the next day leading to their subsequent release, with the charges against the remaining 11 protesters dropped on April 26. The protest occurred amidst nationwide demonstrations on college campuses.

On April 25, 2024, more than 1,000 students, faculty, and staff protested outside of the UT Austin Main Building calling for Hartzell's resignation, along with the local chapter of the American Association of University Professors circulating a petition for an official motion of no-confidence against him. On April 29, the letter was formally delivered to Hartzell with over 500 signatures, including several department chairs and a dean for the College of Liberal Arts. A separate group of at least 165 faculty, including Steve Vladeck, also signed an open letter condemning Hartzell's actions for quelling free speech and endangering the campus community.

A report later released by the UT Austin Committee of Counsel on Academic Freedom and Responsibility (CCAFR) on July 17, 2024, found that UT Austin administrators, under the explicit direction of Hartzell, violated its own institutional rules in clear disregard of freedom of speech and expression protections.

On January 7, 2025, Southern Methodist University announced Hartzell as the next president of the university, ending his tenure with the University of Texas. On February 19, 2025, the University of Texas System's Board of Regents appointed UT Austin's Senior Vice President and Chief Operating Officer Jim Davis as interim President, effective immediately, ending Hartzell's presidency months earlier than expected.

== Southern Methodist University ==
Hartzell formally began his tenure at Southern Methodist University on June 1, 2025.
