= Moore method =

Advanced mathematics teaching technique

The Moore method is a deductive manner of instruction that has been used in advanced mathematics courses. It is named after Robert Lee Moore, an American topologist. Moore first used a thorough-going version of the method at the University of Pennsylvania when he began teaching there in 1911.

The way the course is conducted varies from instructor to instructor, but the content of the course is usually presented in whole or in part by the students themselves. Instead of using a textbook, the students are given a list of definitions and, based on these, theorems which they are to prove and present in class, leading them through the subject material. The Moore method typically limits the amount of material that a class is able to cover, but its advocates claim that it induces a depth of understanding that listening to lectures cannot give.

== The original method ==
F. Burton Jones, a student of Moore and a practitioner of his method, described it as follows:

Moore would begin his graduate course in topology by carefully selecting the members of the class. If a student had already studied topology elsewhere or had read too much, he would exclude him (in some cases, he would run a separate class for such students). The idea was to have a class as homogeneously ignorant (topologically) as possible. He would usually caution the group not to read topology but simply to use their own ability. Plainly he wanted the competition to be as fair as possible, for competition was one of the driving forces. […]

Having selected the class he would tell them briefly his view of the axiomatic method: there were certain undefined terms (e.g., 'point' and 'region') which had meaning restricted (or controlled) by the axioms (e.g., a region is a point set). He would then state the axioms that the class were to start with […]

After stating the axioms and giving motivating examples to illustrate their meaning he would then state some definitions and theorems. He simply read them from his book as the students copied them down. He would then instruct the class to find proofs of their own and also to construct examples to show that the hypotheses of the theorems could not be weakened, omitted, or partially omitted.

When the class returned for the next meeting he would call on some student to prove Theorem 1. After he became familiar with the abilities of the class members, he would call on them in reverse order and in this way give the more unsuccessful students first chance when they did get a proof. He was flexible with this procedure but it was clear that this was the way he preferred it.

When a student stated that he could prove Theorem x, he was asked to go to the blackboard and present his proof. Then the other students, especially those who had not been able to discover a proof, would make sure that the proof presented was correct and convincing. Moore sternly prevented heckling. This was seldom necessary because the whole atmosphere was one of a serious community effort to understand the argument.

When a flaw appeared in a 'proof' everyone would patiently wait for the student at the board to 'patch it up.' If he could not, he would sit down. Moore would then ask the next student to try or if he thought the difficulty encountered was sufficiently interesting, he would save that theorem until next time and go on to the next unproved theorem (starting again at the bottom of the class).

— (Jones 1977)

The students were forbidden to read any book or article about the subject. They were even forbidden to talk about it outside of class. Hersh and John-Steiner (1977) claim that, "this method is reminiscent of a well-known, old method of teaching swimming called 'sink or swim' ".

== Quotations ==
- "That student is taught the best who is told the least." Moore, quote in Parker (2005: vii).
- "I hear, I forget. I see, I remember. I do, I understand." (Chinese proverb that was a favorite of Moore's. Quoted in Halmos, P.R. (1985) I want to be a mathematician: an automathography. Springer-Verlag: 258)
