= Frank Deutsch =

American mathematician

Frank Deutsch (born December 18, 1936) is an American academic applied mathematician specializing in approximation theory. He is an emeritus professor at The Pennsylvania State University, and is the author of over 94 journal articles and two books, and on the editorial board of five journals.

He earned the B.S. in Mechanical Engineering from the University of Hartford (1960), the M.S. in Mathematics from Northwestern University (1961), and the Ph.D. in Applied Mathematics from Brown University (1966) under Philip J. Davis.
