= Jeffery J. Leader =

American mathematician

Jeffery J. Leader (born 1963) is an American academic applied mathematician specializing in numerical analysis. He is a member of the Rose-Hulman Institute of Technology.

Leader received a B.S. in mathematics; B.S.E.E. in electrical engineering (1985) from Syracuse University; Sc.M. (1987); and Ph.D. (1989) from the Division of Applied Mathematics at Brown University under Philip J. Davis. He has also taught at Harvey Mudd College, the Naval Postgraduate School, the United States Military Academy, and Santa Clara University. He was a distinguished visiting professor of mathematical sciences at the U.S. Air Force Academy. He is the author of several journal articles and a textbook called Numerical Analysis and Scientific Computation.
