= Richard Davis Anderson =

American mathematician

- Born: February 17, 1922; Hamden, Connecticut
- Died: March 4, 2008 (aged 86)
- Education: University of Minnesota, University of Texas
- Known for: Topology
- Scientific career
- Fields: Mathematics
- Institutions: University of Pennsylvania, Institute for Advanced Study, Louisiana State University
- Doctoral advisor: Robert Lee Moore

Richard Davis Anderson Sr. (February 17, 1922 – March 4, 2008) was an American mathematician known internationally for his work in infinite-dimensional topology. Much of his early work focused on proofs surrounding Hilbert space and Hilbert cubes.

== Life ==
Richard Anderson and his twin brother, John, were born February 17, 1922, in Hamden, Connecticut. He received a bachelor's degree in mathematics from the University of Minnesota in 1941, after just two years of study. He went on to graduate school at the University of Texas at Austin, where he studied under R. L. Moore. His graduate work was interrupted by World War II. Two days after the Japanese attack on Pearl Harbor, he enlisted in the United States Navy. During his term in the U. S. Navy, he served on the USS Rocky Mount. After returning from the war, he finished his doctoral work at the University of Texas and went on to teach mathematics at the University of Pennsylvania, where he went through the ranks of instructor, assistant professor, and associate professor (from 1951 to 1956). During this time he also spent two years (the academic years 1951–1952 and 1955–1956) at the Institute for Advanced Study in Princeton, New Jersey. He then accepted a post at Louisiana State University, where he became the university's first Boyd Professor of mathematics. Boyd Professor is Louisiana State University's highest professor rank.

== Accomplishments ==
- Served as vice president of the American Mathematical Society in 1972 and 1973.
- Served as president of the Mathematical Association of America in 1981 and 1982.
- Served as chair of the Council of Scientific Society Presidents in 1984.
- Received the Award for Distinguished Service to Mathematics from the Mathematical Association of America in 1978.
- Received the Bolzano Medal from the Czechoslovak Academy of Sciences in 1981.
- Invited lectures at conferences and colloquia in many places in the US and in cities of 21 other countries.
  - Invited Speaker at the ICM in 1970 in Nice
