= Jim Davis (university administrator) =

American university administrator

President of the University of Texas, Austin
- Incumbent
- Assumed office February 19, 2025
- Preceded by: Jay Hartzell

Personal details
- Education: University of Texas, Austin (BA); Harvard University (JD)

James E. Davis is an American university administrator. He is the 31st president of the University of Texas at Austin since 2025.

== Career ==
Davis started his career as a cryptologist for the United States Navy. He received a bachelor's degree in history from UT Austin in 1996 and a Juris Doctor degree from Harvard Law School in 1999. He worked as a briefing attorney for Alberto Gonzales on the Supreme Court of Texas and spent 14 years practicing law for Locke Lord. He worked for Texas Attorney General Ken Paxton as a deputy attorney general for civil litigation before joining UT Austin as vice president for legal affairs in 2018. He was later promoted to senior vice president and chief operating officer in 2023.

Following the announcement of Jay Hartzell's departure to become president of Southern Methodist University, Davis was named the university's interim president in February 2025, several months before Hartzell's planned departure. He was named the sole finalist for the full-time position in July and became the university's president in August. Davis is the first president at UT Austin in over 100 years to come from a non-academic path.

During the second Trump administration, Davis led several changes to UT Austin for "efficiency" in response to growing conservative pressure on higher education from the federal and state governments, especially due to the 2025 passage of Texas Senate Bill 37. These changes have included unilaterally eliminating or consolidating decades-old and nationally renowned departments and programs in ethnic studies, American studies, urban studies, women's and gender studies, French, Italian, Germanic studies, and Slavic studies without said faculty or student input; removing said departments' courses from the core curriculum; denying tenure to an American studies professor despite near-unanimous recommendation; suddenly removing Skills and Experiences Flag requirements for students; replacing deans and other senior leadership outside of the traditional processes; replacing its faculty-elected faculty council with a hand-picked "President's Faculty Advisory Board"; consolidating the School of Information under the College of Natural Sciences; closing student and faculty support programs; and creating a plan to update the university's core to focus more on Western civilization and artificial intelligence, decisions which have been decried as "censorship," "viewpoint discrimination," and threats to academic freedom by faculty, staff, students, and alumni.
