= Anna Mullikin =

American mathematician (1893–1975)

Anna Margaret Mullikin
- Born: March 7, 1893; Baltimore, Maryland
- Died: August 24, 1975 (aged 82); Philadelphia, Pennsylvania
- Burial place: Mt. Olivet Cemetery
- Education: Goucher College; University of Pennsylvania
- Occupation: Mathematician
- Known for: Miss Mullikin's Theorem

Anna Margaret Mullikin (1893–1975) was an American mathematician who was one of the early investigators of point set theory. She was one of the few women to earn a PhD in math before World War II.

== Biography ==
Anna Margaret Mullikin was born in Baltimore, Maryland, March 7, 1893, as the youngest of four children of Sophia Ridgely (Battee) and William Lawrence Mullikin. Anna received her BA from Goucher College, in Towson, Maryland, in 1915. After she graduated Mullikin taught in private schools including Science Hill School in Shelbyville, Kentucky, (1915–1917) and at Mary Baldwin Seminary in Staunton, Virginia, 1917–1918.

Mullikin went on to attend University of Pennsylvania in Philadelphia for doctoral work. She was Robert Lee Moore's third student, graduating with her PhD in 1922 with a dissertation titled Certain Theorems Relating to Plane Connected Point Sets. Her dissertation was published that year in Transactions of the American Mathematical Society and subsequently became the catalyst for significant advances in the field of topology. Her main result was initially referred to as "Miss Mullikin's Theorem" but by 1928 it was called the "Janiszewski-Mullikin theorem."

During 1921–1922, while studying for her doctorate, she taught at Oak Lane Country Day School, which served preschool and elementary-aged children in Pennsylvania.

As a PhD, she spent her career as a secondary school mathematics teacher, beginning at William Penn High School in Philadelphia for one year (1922–1923) before moving to Germantown High School (Philadelphia). There she became a mentor to Mary-Elizabeth Hamstrom, who would go on to become a student of Moore and professional mathematician herself. At Germantown High School she was named department head of the mathematics in 1952, and she remained there until her retirement in 1959.

Anna Mullikin died August 24, 1975, in Philadelphia at 82 and was interred in Mt. Olivet Cemetery in Baltimore, Maryland.
