= Vera John-Steiner =

Educational psychologist (1930–2017)

- Born: June 13, 1930; Budapest, Hungary
- Died: December 6, 2017 (aged 87); Santa Fe, NM
- Occupation: Professor of Psychology
- Awards: Lifetime Contribution Award from the Cultural Historical Special Interest Group of the American Educational Research Association (2006); Distinguished Contributions to Social Contexts in Education Research – Lifetime Achievement Award from the American Educational Research Association (2007)

Academic background
- Education: University of Chicago

Academic work
- Discipline: Educational Psychology
- Institutions: University of New Mexico

Vera (Veronka) John-Steiner (1930–2017) was a Hungarian-American educational psychologist and activist. She was known for her work on creative collaboration, and her contributions to psycholinguistics, cultural-historical activity theory, cross-cultural education, bilingualism, psychology of women, and cognitive psychology. Her theoretical framework was heavily influenced by the work of Lev Vygotsky. In 2007, the American Educational Research Association honored her with its Lifetime Achievement Award.

John-Steiner was a professor of Linguistics and Educational Psychology at the University of New Mexico for over 40 years.

== Honors and awards ==
- William James Book Award from the American Psychological Association for Notebooks of the Mind: Explorations of Thinking (1989)
- Fellowship at the Stanford University Center for Advanced Study in the Behavioral Sciences (1989–1990)
- University of New Mexico, College of Education OFAC grant "Collaborative Cognition: A Study of Patterns and Practices" (1994)
- University of New Mexico, College of Education RAC grant "Shared and Contrasting Perceptions of Collaboration by Dyads and Small Groups" (1995)
- National Science Foundation grant "Complex Collaborations" (with M. Minnis and R. Weber) (1995–1996)
- Annual Research Lecture at the University of New Mexico (1998)
- Lifetime Contribution Award from the Cultural Historical Special Interest Group of the American Educational Research Association (2006)
- Distinguished Contributions to Social Contexts in Education Research – Lifetime Achievement Award from the American Educational Research Association (2007)

== Biography ==
Veronka Polgar was born in Budapest, Hungary to parents Ferenc and Sophie Polgar. She first arrived in the United States as a World War II refugee, after being imprisoned in Bergen-Belsen concentration camp during the Holocaust.

John-Steiner studied at Columbia University where she received her Bachelor of Arts degree. She then sought a Doctorate in Social and Developmental Psychology from the University of Chicago. In that time she met and married neuroscientist Roy John.

In her time at the University of Chicago, John-Steiner opposed McCarthyism as she became more involved in student political activities. In addition, her participation in the Civil Rights Movement presented her with the opportunity to engage with notable figures such as Paul Robeson, W.E.B DuBois, and Malcolm X.

John-Steiner was an activist who was passionate about education and cross-cultural outreach. This led her to engage in collaborative projects with Head Start programs and Navajo reservations. Her educational journey led to faculty positions at the University of California Los Angeles, the University of Rochester, and Yeshiva University. She subsequently moved to Santa Fe, NM with her second husband, Stan Steiner, and joined the faculty of the University of New Mexico as a Regents Professor. In 1998, John Steiner was awarded as an Annual Research Lecturer at University of New Mexico, one of the most prestigious accolades the university awards to its faculty members in recognition of their academic and creative contributions.

John-Steiner died on December 6, 2017, at the age on 87 years old at her home in Santa Fe.

== Research ==
John-Steiner made significant contributions to the study of human development, learning, cognition, and culture. Her research about cross-cultural education and creative collaboration has continued to be studied and expanded on by researchers who saw her work as foundational to the field.

John-Steiner is well-known for expanding ideas of Lev Vygotsky, specifically his concept of the Zone of Proximal Development, an educational psychology term which details how a learner's environment is shaped by educational contexts. Her work expanded Vygotsky's framework to encompass collaboration, specifically as it relates to pedagogy and educator-learner relationships, which was valuable in furthering understanding of how emotional and affective factors influence an individual's learning and creative development. John-Steiner also built upon seminal models and theories of intelligence by Jerome Bruner and Howard Gardner, and established new frameworks for interdisciplinary models of creativity. Her work led to insights about the use of "invisible tools" that creative thinkers accumulate as they develop their ideas. Under this framework, creative thinkers have access to mental reservoirs of experiences (e.g., memories, anxiety and other emotions, mentorship and other relationships), which they draw on when making novel contributions to their respective fields.

John-Steiner's book "Notebooks of the Mind: Explorations of Thinking" won the William James Award from the American Psychological Association in 1989. This book focused on how the creative experience is shaped by development, motivation, and sociocultural differences. For this book, John-Steiner interviewed 50 men and women who were prominent thinkers and contributors to the sciences, humanities, and arts. She unpacked the various ways that creative thinking can develop, focusing on individual differences, and detailing how social and cultural context influence creative thought. Through the voices of the interviewees, John-Steiner shared the different ways that ideas may coalesce and how the work produces is a mirror of individual competencies, knowledge, and skills. In this volume, she emphasized the importance of the environment or context in the creative experience and process. In her 1986 review, Jane Ferris-Richardson wrote that John-Steiner finds that creativity is ever growing and developing and that the part that the educational environment plays in fostering this experience is essential. John-Steiner's subsequent book, "Creative Collaboration" focused on interpersonal dynamics and how creative thought is shaped by partnerships, friendships, collaborations, and communities. She utilized biographies and conducted semi structured interviews when possible to establish a well informed study of collaborative relationships.

John-Steiner was passionate about the diversity of human cognition, and rejected the idea that there is a single framework that defines human thought, otherwise known as cognitive universalism. In her essay "Cognitive Pluralism: A Whorfian Analysis," John-Steiner expanded upon language as it relates to thought, further developing the Sapir-Whorf hypothesis, or the idea that one's language community affects how people interpret and categorize the world around them.

After retirement, John-Steiner published "Loving and Hating Mathematics: Challenging the myths of mathematical life" (2010), coauthored with Rueben Hersh. According to reviewers, Borwein and Osborn, the book aims to dispel common myths about how learners and educators interact with mathematics.

== Academic and social impact ==
The book "Constructing a Community of Thought: Letters on the Scholarship, Teaching, and Mentoring of Vera John Steiner," is a collection of letters addressed to John-Steiner, which highlight and validate her contributions to teaching and mentoring generations of students and scholars. In his letter to John-Steiner, Peter Smagorinsky of the University of Georgia describes John-Steiner as humble, gracious, and wise. He defines her as someone who "defied orthodoxy" in both her political leanings as well as her academic philosophy and pedagogy.

== Books ==
- Cole, M., John-Steiner, V., Scribner, S., & Souberman, S. (Eds.). (1978). Mind in society: the development of higher psychological processes. Harvard University Press.
- Connery, M. C., John-Steiner, V., & Marjanovic-Shane, A. (Eds.). (2010). Vygotsky and creativity: A cultural-historical approach to play, meaning making, and the arts. Peter Lang.
- Hersh, R., & John-Steiner, V. (2010). Loving and hating mathematics: Challenging the myths of mathematical life. Princeton University Press.
- John-Steiner, V. (1971). Early childhood bilingual education. Modern Language Association.
- John-Steiner, V. (1986). Notebooks of the mind: explorations of thinking. Oxford University Press.
- John-Steiner, V. (2000). Creative collaboration. Oxford University Press.
- John-Steiner, V., Cazden, C., & Hymes, D. (Eds.). (1972). The functions of language in the classroom. Teacher’s College Press.
- John-Steiner, V., Panofsky, C., & Smith, L. (Eds.) (1994). Sociocultural approaches to language & literacy: an interactionist perspective. Cambridge University Press.

== Representative papers ==
- Hersh, R., & John-Steiner, V. (2016). The origin of insight in mathematics. In R. Leikin & B. Sriraman (Eds.) Creativity and Giftedness: Advances in Mathematics Education (pp. 135–146). Cham. https://doi.org/10.1007/978-3-319-38840-3_9
- John-Steiner, V., & Hersh, R. (2014). Creative transformations of ethical challenges. In S. Moran, D. Cropley, &. J. C. Kaufman (Eds.)The Ethics of Creativity (pp. 205–220). Palgrave Macmillan. https://doi.org/10.1057/9781137333544_12
- John-Steiner, V., & Mahn, H. (1996). Sociocultural approaches to learning and development: A Vygotskian framework. Educational Psychologist, 31(3–4), 191–206. https://doi.org/10.1080/00461520.1996.9653266
- John-Steiner, V., Meehan, T. M., & Mahn, H. (1998). A functional systems approach to concept development. Mind, Culture, and Activity, 5(2), 127–134. https://doi.org/10.1207/s15327884mca0502_6
- Mahn, H., John-Steiner, V., & Csikszentmihalyi, M. (1996). Psychological uses of complexity theory. The American Journal of Psychology, 109(3), 465–475. https://doi.org/10.2307/1423017
