= Robert Lee Moore =

American mathematician

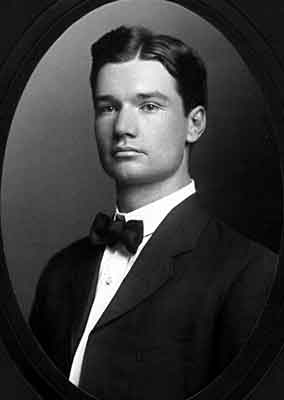
- R. L. Moore in 1904
- Born: November 14, 1882; Dallas, Texas, US
- Died: October 4, 1974 (aged 91); Austin, Texas, US
- Education: University of Chicago (Ph.D., 1905)
- Scientific career
- Fields: Mathematics
- Workplaces: University of Texas at Austin
- Thesis: Sets of Metrical Hypotheses for Geometry (1905)
- Doctoral advisor: Oswald Veblen; E. H. Moore
- Doctoral students: Richard Anderson; R. H. Bing; Mary-Elizabeth Hamstrom; F. Burton Jones; John Kline; Edwin E Moise; Anna Mullikin; Mary Ellen Rudin; Gordon Whyburn; Raymond Wilder

Robert Lee Moore (November 14, 1882 – October 4, 1974) was an American mathematician who taught for many years at the University of Texas. He is known for his work in general topology, for the Moore method of teaching university mathematics, and for his racist treatment of African-American mathematics students.

== Life ==
Although Moore's father was reared in New England and was of New England ancestry, he fought in the American Civil War on the side of the Confederacy. After the war, he ran a hardware store in Dallas, then little more than a railway stop, and raised six children, of whom Robert, named after the commander of the Confederate Army of Northern Virginia, was the fifth.

Moore entered the University of Texas at the unusually youthful age of 15, in 1898, already knowing calculus thanks to self-study. He completed the B.Sc. in three years instead of the usual four; his teachers included G. B. Halsted and L. E. Dickson. After a year as a teaching fellow at Texas, he taught high school for a year in Marshall, Texas.

An assignment of Halsted's led Moore to prove that one of Hilbert's axioms for geometry was redundant. When E. H. Moore (no relation), who headed the Department of Mathematics at the University of Chicago, and whose research interests were on the foundations of geometry, heard of Robert's feat, he arranged for a scholarship that would allow Robert to study for a doctorate at Chicago. Oswald Veblen supervised Moore's 1905 thesis, titled Sets of Metrical Hypotheses for Geometry.

Moore then taught one year at the University of Tennessee, two years at Princeton University, and three years at Northwestern University. In 1910, he married Margaret MacLelland Key of Brenham, Texas; they had no children. In 1911, he took up a position at the University of Pennsylvania.

In 1920, Moore returned to the University of Texas at Austin as an associate professor and was promoted to full professor three years later. In 1951, he went on half pay but continued to teach five classes a year, including a section of freshman calculus, until the University authorities forced his definitive retirement in 1969, his 87th year.

A strong supporter of the American Mathematical Society, he presided over it, 1936–38. He edited its Colloquium Publications, 1929–33, and was the editor-in-chief, 1930–33. In 1931, he was elected to the National Academy of Sciences.

== Topologist ==
According to the bibliography in Wilder (1976), Moore published 67 papers and one monograph, his 1932 Foundations of Point Set Theory. He is primarily remembered for his work on the foundations of topology, a topic he first touched on in his Ph.D. thesis. By the time Moore returned to the University of Texas, he had published 17 papers on point-set topology—a term he coined—including his 1915 paper "On a set of postulates which suffice to define a number-plane", giving an axiom system for plane topology. The Moore plane, Moore's road space, Moore space, Moore's quotient theorem and the normal Moore space conjecture are named in his honor.

== Unusual teacher ==
Robert Lee Moore is known to have supervised 50 doctoral dissertations, almost all at Texas, including those of R. H. Bing, F. Burton Jones, John R. Kline, Edwin Evariste Moise, Mary Ellen Rudin, Gordon Whyburn, Richard Davis Anderson, and Raymond Louis Wilder. Moore has been described as having been one of the most charismatic and inspiring university teachers of mathematics ever active in the United States. Accounts have been given of his ability to teach students who had never previously distinguished themselves in mathematics how to do proofs. He went out of his way to teach elementary and service courses every year, and actually forbade his pre-doctoral level students from consulting the mathematical literature.

It was while attending lectures at the University of Chicago that Moore first hit on his original teaching methods. Finding these lectures rather boring, even mind dulling, he would liven up a lecture by running a race in his mind with the lecturer, by trying to discover the proof of an announced theorem before the lecturer had finished his presentation. Moore often won this silent race, and when he did not, he felt that he was better off from having made the attempt. It was at the University of Pennsylvania, while teaching a course on the foundations of geometry, that Moore first tried out the teaching methods that came to be known as the Moore method. The success of this method led others to adopt it and similar methods.

== Prejudice ==
Moore's record as a teacher of mathematics has been tarnished by his racism towards black students. Most of Moore's career was spent in a racially segregated part of the United States. African-American students were prohibited from even enrolling at the University of Texas until the late 1950s, and Moore himself was strongly in favor of segregation. After the University of Texas began admitting African-American students, he refused to allow them into his classes, even for mathematics graduate students such as Vivienne Malone-Mayes. He told another African-American mathematics student, Walker E. Hunt, "you are welcome to take my course but you start with a C and can only go down from there". On one occasion he walked out of a talk by a student, his academic grandchild, after discovering that the speaker was African-American.

Moore was also known for repeatedly claiming that female students were inferior to male students, and, though "less pronounced than his racism", for his antisemitism. However, while Moore's racism is confirmed by several first-hand accounts of his refusal to teach African-American students, the often-repeated description of him as a misogynist and antisemite is based largely on his oral remarks. Some of the sources reporting these remarks, such as Mary Ellen Rudin, also point out that in fact he encouraged females who showed mathematical talent and that he had Jewish students, such as Edwin E. Moise (who was asked about Moore's anti-Semitic reputation in an interview) and Martin Ettlinger, and close colleagues, such as Hyman J. Ettlinger. His encouragement of Rudin and other white female students is documented and between 1949 and 1970 (the earliest period when national data are known) 4 of Moore's 31 doctoral students (13%) were female, while nationally 175 were female out of 2646 doctoral graduates in mathematics and statistics (7%).

== Honors ==
- The "Physics, Math, and Astronomy Building" at the University of Texas was renamed Robert Lee Moore Hall in 1973. In 2020, following complaints and petitions in 2019 and then the 2020 George Floyd protests and Black Lives Matter movement, the name was changed back to the "Physics, Math, and Astronomy Building".

== Quotations ==
- "That student is taught the best who is told the least." Moore, quote in Parker (2005: vii).
- "I hear, I forget. I see, I remember. I do, I understand." (Chinese proverb that was a favorite of Moore's. Quoted in Halmos, P.R. (1985) I want to be a mathematician: an automathography. Springer-Verlag: 258)
