= The Mathematical Experience =

1981 book by Philip J. Davis and Reuben Hersh

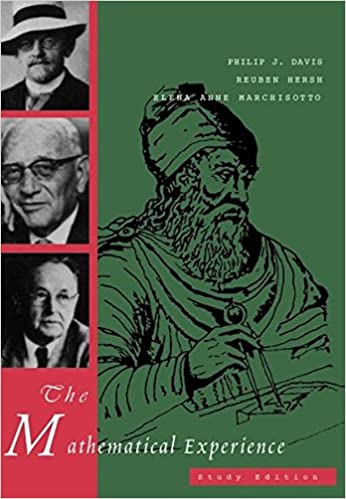
- Author: Philip J. Davis and Reuben Hersh
- Language: English
- Genre: Mathematics; Philosophy; History
- Publisher: Springer
- Publication date: 1981
- Publication place: United States
- Media type: Print (Hardcover)
- Pages: 487pp (Second Edition)

The Mathematical Experience (1981) is a book by Philip J. Davis and Reuben Hersh that discusses the practice of modern mathematics from a historical and philosophical perspective. The book discusses the psychology of mathematicians, and gives examples of famous proofs and outstanding problems. It goes on to speculate about what a proof really means, in relationship to actual truth. Other topics include mathematics in education and some of the math that occurs in computer science.

The first paperback edition won a U.S. National Book Award in Science. (Note: This was the 1983 award for paperback Science. From 1980 to 1983 in National Book Award history there were dual hardcover and paperback awards in most categories, and several nonfiction subcategories including General Nonfiction. Most of the paperback award-winners were reprints, including this one.) It is cited by some mathematicians as influential in their decision to continue their studies in graduate school; and has been hailed as a classic of mathematical literature. On the other hand, Martin Gardner disagreed with some of the authors' philosophical opinions.

A new edition, published in 1995, includes exercises and problems, making the book more suitable for classrooms. There is also The Companion Guide to The Mathematical Experience, Study Edition. Both were co-authored with Elena Marchisotto. Davis and Hersh wrote a follow-up book, Descartes' Dream: The World According to Mathematics (Harcourt, 1986), and each has written other books with related themes, such as Mathematics And Common Sense: A Case of Creative Tension by Davis and What is Mathematics, Really? by Hersh.
