= Philip J. Davis =

American mathematician (1923–2018)

- Born: January 2, 1923; Lawrence, Massachusetts, U.S.
- Died: March 14, 2018 (aged 95)
- Education: Harvard University
- Awards: Chauvenet Prize (1963); Lester R. Ford Award (1982)
- Scientific career
- Fields: Mathematics
- Workplaces: Brown University
- Doctoral advisor: Ralph Philip Boas, Jr.
- Doctoral students: Frank Deutsch; Jeffery J. Leader

Philip Jacob Davis (January 2, 1923 – March 14, 2018) was an American academic applied mathematician.

== Biography ==
Davis was born in Lawrence, Massachusetts. He was known for his work in numerical analysis and approximation theory, as well as his investigations in the history and philosophy of mathematics. He earned his degrees in mathematics from Harvard University (SB, 1943; PhD, 1950, advisor Ralph P. Boas, Jr.), and his final position was Professor Emeritus at the Division of Applied Mathematics at Brown University.

He served briefly in an aerodynamics research position in the Air Force in World War II before joining the National Bureau of Standards (now the National Institute of Standards and Technology). He became Chief of Numerical Analysis there and worked on the well-known Abramowitz and Stegun Handbook of Mathematical Functions before joining Brown in 1963.

He was awarded the Chauvenet Prize for mathematical writing in 1963 for an article on the gamma function, and won numerous other prizes, including being chosen to deliver the 1991 Hendrick Lectures of the MAA (which became the basis for his book Spirals: From Theodorus to Chaos). He was a frequent invited lecturer and authored several books. Among the best known are The Mathematical Experience (with Reuben Hersh), a popular survey of modern mathematics and its history and philosophy; Methods of Numerical Integration (with Philip Rabinowitz), long the standard work on the subject of quadrature; and Interpolation and Approximation, still an important reference in this area.

For The Mathematical Experience (1981), Davis and Hersh won a National Book Award in Science. (Note: This was the 1983 award for paperback Science. From 1980 to 1983 in National Book Award history there were dual hardcover and paperback awards in most categories, and several nonfiction subcategories including General Nonfiction. Most of the paperback award-winners were reprints, including this one.)

Davis also wrote an autobiography, The Education of a Mathematician; some of his other books include autobiographical sections as well. In addition, he published works of fiction. His best-known book outside the field of mathematics is The Thread: A Mathematical Yarn (1983, 2nd ed. 1989), which "has raised Digression into a literary form" (Gerard Piel); it takes off from the name of the Russian mathematician Tschebyscheff, and in the course of explaining why he insists on that "barbaric, Teutonic, non-standard orthography" (in the words of a reader of Interpolation and Approximation who wrote him to complain), he digresses in many amusing directions.

Davis died on March 14, 2018, at the age of 95.

== Publications ==
- Ancient Loons: Stories David Pingree Told Me (2016)
- Circulant matrices
- Descartes' Dream: The World According to Mathematics by Philip J. Davis and Reuben Hersh
- Interpolation and approximation
- Mathematical Encounters of the Second Kind
- Mathematics & Common Sense: A Case of Creative Tension (2006)
- Mathematics, Substance and Surmise: Views on the Meaning and Ontology of Mathematics by Ernest Davis and Philip J. Davis
- Methods of numerical integration
- Numerical Integration by Philip Davis, Philip J & Rabinowitz
- Spirals: From Theodorus to Chaos
- The Companion Guide to the Mathematical Experience: by Philip J. Davis and Reuben Hersh
- The Education of a Mathematician (2000)
- The Lore of Large Numbers (1961)
- The Mathematical Experience (Modern Birkhäuser Classics) (2011)
- The mathematics of matrices: A first book of matrix theory and linear algebra
- The Schwarz Function and Its Applications (Carus Mathematical Monographs #17) (1974)
- The Thread: A Mathematical Yarn
- Thomas Gray, Philosopher Cat (1988)
- Thomas Gray in Copenhagen: In Which the Philosopher Cat Meets the Ghost of Hans Christian Andersen (1995)
- Unity and Disunity and Other Mathematical Essays, American Math Society, (2015)
