= F. Burton Jones =

American mathematician

Floyd Burton Jones (November 22, 1910, Cisco, Texas – April 15, 1999, Santa Barbara, California) was an American mathematician, active mainly in topology.

Jones's father was a pharmacist and local politician in Shackelford County, Texas. As the valedictorian of his high school class, Jones earned a Regents' Scholarship to The University of Texas, intending to study law eventually. Jones soon discovered that he had a poor memory for dates and history, and thus changed his major to chemistry.

Jones had the extraordinary good fortune to be taught freshman calculus by Robert Lee Moore, a founder of topology in the US, a legendary mathematics teacher, and the inventor of the Moore method. Jones went on to take more mathematics courses than required to be a chemist. He displayed sufficient ability in those courses that when he graduated in 1932, Moore invited him to do a Ph.D. in mathematics and offered him a part-time job as a math instructor. Moore later supervised Jones's Ph.D. dissertation, completed in 1935.

Jones then taught at the University of Texas for the next 15 years except during 1942–44, when he was a research associate at the Harvard Underwater Sound Laboratory, helping develop scanning sonar for the Navy. In 1950, Jones moved to the University of North Carolina, where he eventually headed the Department of Mathematics. From 1962 until his 1978 retirement, he was at the University of California at Riverside, where he helped launch the doctoral program in mathematics. Over the course of his career, Jones published 67 articles and supervised 15 Ph.D. dissertations. In 1987, he endowed a Chair in Topology at the University of California at Riverside.

Jones taught using a modified version of the Moore method. He believed in "learning by doing" but unlike Moore, he incorporated textbooks into his courses. In 1969, Louis McAuley wrote of "the magical powers of Jones in the classroom—a master who breathes the very life of mathematics into his students."
