= Reuben Hersh =

American mathematician (1927–2020)

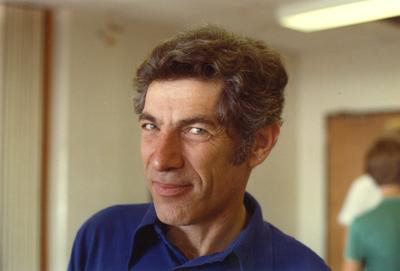
- Hersh in 1979
- Born: Reuben Laznovsky; December 9, 1927; New York City, U.S.
- Died: January 3, 2020 (aged 92); Santa Fe, New Mexico, U.S.
- Education: Harvard University (BA); New York University (PhD)
- Known for: The Mathematical Experience; Humanist philosophy of mathematics
- Awards: National Book Award (1983); Chauvenet Prize (1984)
- Scientific career
- Fields: Mathematics, philosophy of mathematics
- Workplaces: University of New Mexico
- Doctoral advisor: Peter Lax

Reuben Hersh (December 9, 1927 – January 3, 2020) was an American mathematician and academic of Jewish heritage, best known for his writings on the nature, practice, and social impact of mathematics. Although he was generally known as Reuben Hersh, late in life he sometimes used the name Reuben Laznovsky in recognition of his father's ancestral family name. His work challenges and complements mainstream philosophy of mathematics.

== Education ==
Born to Jewish immigrant parents in New York City, Hersh later wrote extensively about the Jewish experience in American mathematics. After receiving a B.A. in English literature from Harvard University in 1946, Hersh spent a decade writing for Scientific American and working as a machinist. After losing his right thumb when working with a band saw, he decided to study mathematics at the Courant Institute of Mathematical Sciences. In 1962, he was awarded a Ph.D. in mathematics from New York University; his advisor was P.D. Lax. He was affiliated with the University of New Mexico since 1964, where he was professor emeritus.

== Academic career ==
Hersh wrote a number of technical articles on partial differential equations, probability, random evolutions (example), and linear operator equations. He was the co-author of four articles in Scientific American, and 12 articles in the Mathematical Intelligencer.

Hersh was best known as the co-author with Philip J. Davis of The Mathematical Experience (1981), which won a National Book Award in Science. (Note: This was the 1983 award for paperback Science. From 1980 to 1983 in National Book Award history there were dual hardcover and paperback awards in most categories, and several nonfiction subcategories including General Nonfiction. Most of the paperback award-winners were reprints, including this one.) Hersh and Martin Davis won the 1984 Chauvenet Prize for their Scientific American article on Hilbert's tenth problem.

Hersh advocated what he called a "humanist" philosophy of mathematics, opposed to both Platonism (so-called "realism") and its rivals nominalism/fictionalism/formalism. He held that mathematics is real, and its reality is social-cultural-historical, located in the shared thoughts of those who learn it, teach it, and create it. His article "The Kingdom of Math is Within You" (a chapter in his Experiencing Mathematics, 2014) explains how mathematicians' proofs compel agreement, even when they are inadequate as formal logic. He sympathized with the perspectives on mathematics of Imre Lakatos and Where Mathematics Comes From, George Lakoff and Rafael Nunez, Basic Books.

== Books ==
- 1981, Hersh and Philip Davis. The Mathematical Experience. (Mariner Books, 1999).
- 1986, Hersh and Philip Davis. Descartes' Dream: The World According to Mathematics. (Dover, 2005)
- 1997. What Is Mathematics, Really? Oxford Univ. Press.
- 2006, edited by Hersh. 18 Unconventional Essays on the Nature of Mathematics. Springer Verlag.
- 2009, Hersh and Vera John-Steiner. Loving and Hating Mathematics. Princeton University Press
- Greenwood, P.; Hersh, R. "Stochastic differentials and quasi-standard random variables", Probabilistic methods in differential equations (Proc. Conf., Univ. Victoria, Victoria, B. C., 1974), pp. 35–62. Lecture Notes in Math., Vol. 451, Springer, Berlin, 1975.
- 2014, Reuben Hersh. Experiencing Mathematics: What do we do, when we do mathematics? American Mathematical Society.
- 2015, Reuben Hersh. Peter Lax: Mathematician. American Mathematical Society.

== See also ==
- Influence of non-standard analysis
